= Government of Ahmad Qavam (1946) =

- cabinet of Iran

- Date formed: 27 January 1946
- Date dissolved: 31 July 1946

People and organisations
- Head of state: Mohammad Reza Shah
- Head of government: Ahmad Qavam
- No. of ministers: 12
- Member parties: Democrat Party; Iran Party

History
- Successor: Qavam VII

Ahmad Qavam became the Prime Minister of Iran on 27 January 1946, succeeding Ebrahim Hakimi. Qavam who won the competition for office over Hossein Pirnia with 53 to 52 votes, was supported by the Tudeh fraction while deputies associated with the National Will Party voted against him, according to Jamil Hasanli.

He spent three weeks bargaining with the Shah over the composition of his cabinet, and presented his ministers to the parliament on 17 February, before his scheduled trip to Moscow, asking for postponement of the debates for vote of confidence until his return. He deliberately returned just before the end of the 14th term, and expressed his regret for lack of time with "sardonic humor", in the last parliamentary session, when his ministers were approved.

Qavam himself held ministries of Interior and Foreign Affairs; while according to Ervand Abrahamian "gave five cabinet posts to his close supporters; yielded two others to court favorites; and handed the War Ministry to General Amir Ahmedi... whose ambitions and independent mind had often disturbed the young shah".

== Cabinet ==
Members of Qavam's cabinet were:

Portfolio	Minister	Took office	Left office	Party	Ref
Prime Minister	Ahmad Qavam	27 January 1946	31 July 1946	Democrat Party	
Foreign Minister	Ahmad Qavam	10 March 1946	31 July 1946	Democrat Party	
Interior Minister	Ahmad Qavam	10 March 1946	31 July 1946	Democrat Party	
Deputy Prime Minister	Mozaffar Firouz	10 March 1946	31 July 1946	Democrat Party	
Agriculture Minister	Shamseddin Amir-Alaei (head of ministry)	10 March 1946	31 July 1946	Iran Party	
Culture Minister	Mohammad-Taqi Bahar	10 March 1946	31 July 1946	Democrat Party	
Finance Minister	Morteza-Qoli Bayat	10 March 1946	31 July 1946	Nonpartisan	
Justice Minister	Anoushirvan Sepahbodi	10 March 1946	31 July 1946	Nonpartisan	
Post & Telegraph Minister	Sahameddin Ghaffari	10 March 1946	31 July 1946	Nonpartisan	
Public Health Minister	Manouchehr Eghbal	10 March 1946	31 July 1946	Democrat Party	
Roads Minister	Hossein Firouz	10 March 1946	31 July 1946	Military	
Trade and Industry Minister	Ahmad Ali Sepehr	10 March 1946	31 July 1946	Nonpartisan	
War Minister	Ahmad Amir-Ahmadi	10 March 1946	31 July 1946	Military	
Minister without portfolio	Ahmad Matin-Daftari	10 March 1946	31 July 1946	Nonpartisan	
