= 1947 Iranian legislative election =

- 31 December 1946/January 1947/Summer 1947

All 136 seats to the National Consultative Assembly
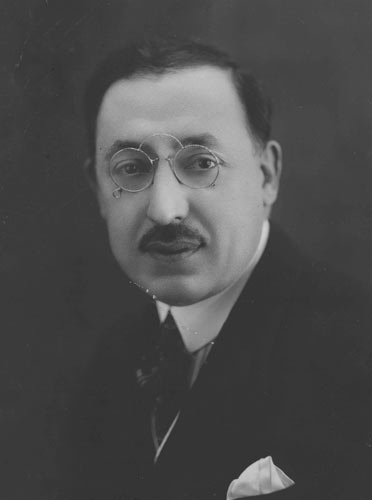

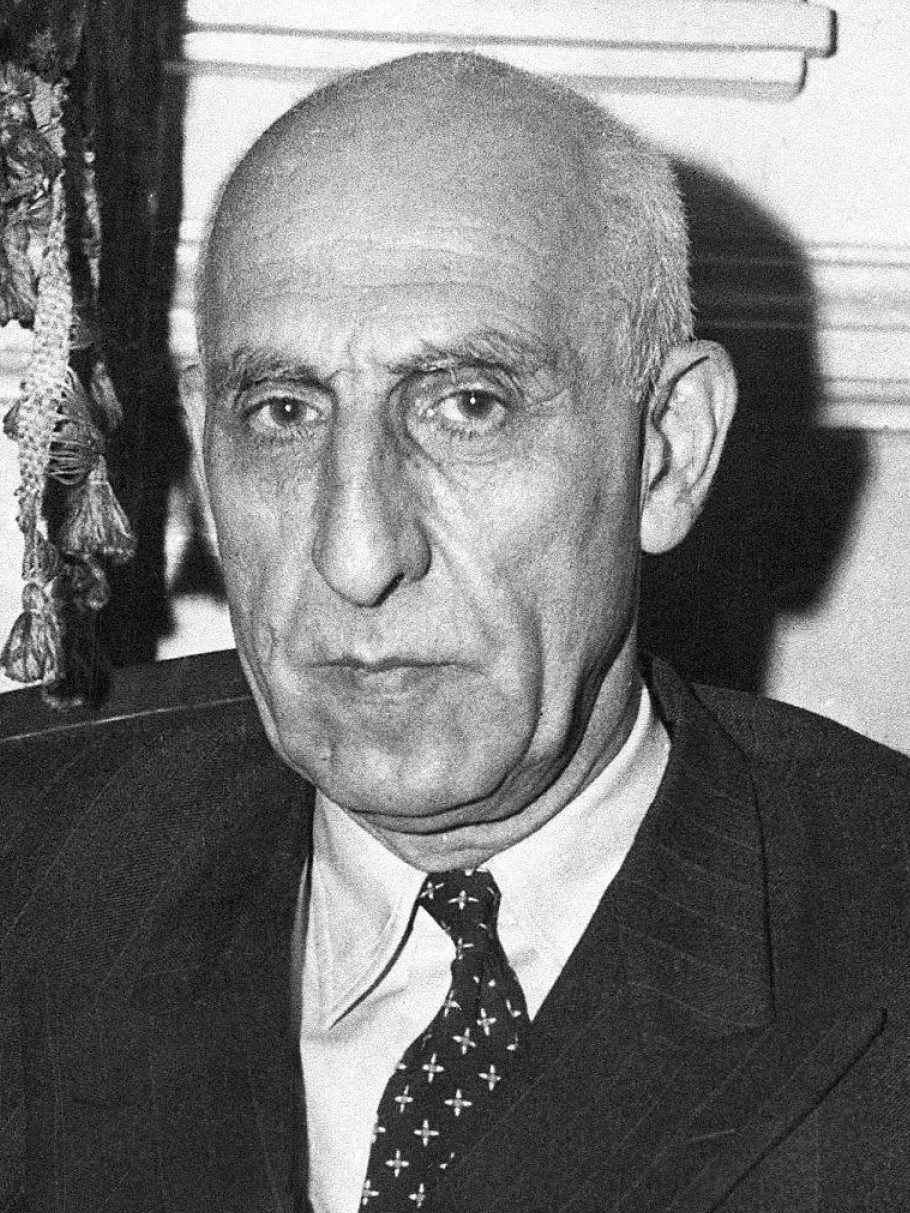

	First party	Second party
Leader	Ahmad Qavam	Mohammad Mosaddegh
Party	Democrat Party	—
Alliance	—	Opposition (Note: Mohammad Mosaddegh, though not a member of the parliament, led the main opposition. National Front was established in 1949 and hence was not present in the election. Most opposition members were Iran Party former members who split to Iran Unity Party after its alliance with Tudeh Party and Azerbaijani Democratic Party.)
Leader's seat	Did not stand	Ran in Tehran (lost)
Seats won	73	25
Seat change	New	New
	Third party	Fourth party
Leader	Reza Radmanesh
Party	Parties: Tudeh Party; Iran Party; Socialist Party; Jungle Party; Democrat Party of Kurdistan; Democrat Party of Azerbaijan	Independent
Alliance	United Front of Progressive Parties
Leader's seat	Ran in Lahijan and Langeroud (lost)
Seats won	2	36
Seat change	▼6
Prime Minister before election
Ahmad Qavam
Democrat Party
Elected Prime Minister
Ahmad Qavam
Democrat Party

Parliamentary elections were held in Iran in 1947. The newly elected parliament was opened on 17 July. The election was a three-way power struggle between Ahmad Qavam, Mohammad Reza Pahlavi and pro-Britain conservative politicians.

Prime Minister Qavam's control over electoral machinery was in many districts challenged by "Imperial Iranian Army officers, independent local magnates and pro-British provincial governors".

A public protest by shopkeepers, bazaaris and university students and headed by Mohammad Mosaddegh among other politicians was held to call for a free elections, however, despite Qavam's promise to hold a free election, it was "rigged" and his Democrat Party of Iran won the majority, including all 12 seats in Tehran.

== Fraction members ==
Fraction	Seats	Leader(s)
Democrats	80	Mohammad-Reza Hekmat (conservative wing); Mohammad-Taqi Bahar (intellectual right-wing)
National Unionists	35	Ezatollah Bayat, Ardalan and Matin-Daftari (Note: Bayat was the son of Abasgholi Bayat, Saham ol-Molk, a former finance minister. Both Bayat and Matin-Daftari were additionally the sons-in law of Mossadegh.)
National Caucus (pro-British)	25	Madani and Taheri
Source: Abrahamian
