= Mosaddeghism =

Iranian liberal ideology

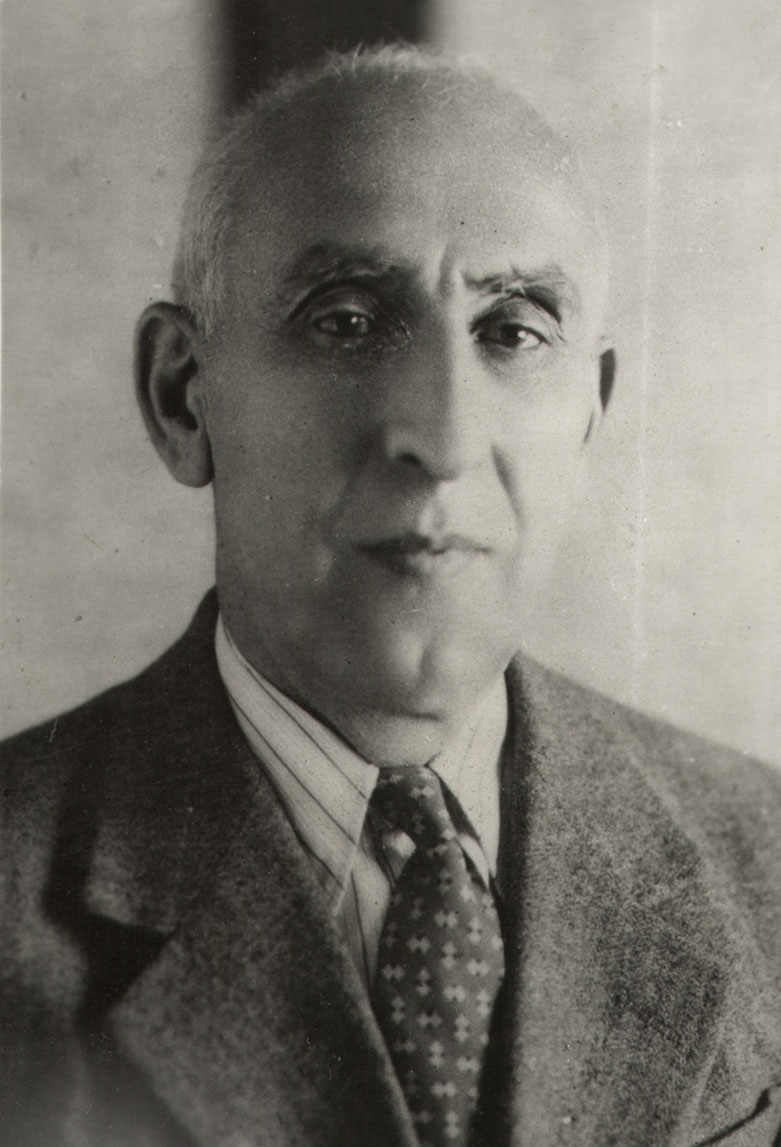
Mohammad Mosaddegh, after whom Mosaddeghism is named

Mosaddeghism is a left-liberal and social democratic ideology that refers to the political doctrine and set of policies supported by Mohammad Mosaddegh, the Prime Minister of Iran from 1951 to 1953. This policy represents a convergence of Iranian nationalism and constitutional democracy, and aimed to secure Iran's sovereignty and economic independence in the aftermath of the Anglo-Soviet occupation. This ideology was to be achieved through a number of policies, most prominently in 1951 when Iran nationalized the vast natural resources held by the British-owned Anglo-Iranian Oil Company (AIOC).

== Doctrine ==
=== Economic self-determination ===
Mosaddegh believed that true political independence was impossible without economic independence. The nationalization law of 1951 was a de facto manifestation of this principle that rejected concessionary system, which historically benefited foreign powers at the expense of the Iranian state.

=== Anti-imperialism and Non-Alignment ===
Mosaddeghism was a powerful anti-imperialist whose focus was on eliminating Britain's pervasive influence and later resisting pressure from the Soviet Union in the early Cold War era. It pursued a 'Negative Equilibrium' (موازنه منفی) policy, meaning Iran refused to make concessions to all foreign powers rather than keeping concessions between rival powers in balance.

=== Social reform and justice ===
This ideology incorporated elements of social democracy. Mosaddegh's reforms included measures to protect industrial workers, establish compulsory unemployment insurance, and transfer land from Shah's estate to the public domain to address farmers' conditions. These reforms aimed to create a fair and equitable distribution of the national wealth created in the oil industry.

== National Front ==
The main political organization that propagated and implemented Mosaddeghism was the National Front. Founded in 1949, it was a broad coalition that united various groups, including liberal democrats, non-communist socialists, moderate conservatives, and secular nationalists, to achieve the common goal of protecting the constitution and nationalizing oil.

== Downfall and legacy ==
Mosaddeghism was forced to end in 1953 by the U.S. CIA and British MI6 as a result of the 1953 Iranian coup d'état. His overthrow brought Shah Mohammad Reza Pahlavi back to absolute power and halted progressive experimentation. This incident sparked strong anti-American and anti-imperialist sentiment in Iran, which led to the 1979 Iranian Revolution.

Mosaddeghism remains one of the most important and influential political trends in modern Iranian history; in today's Islamic Republic of Iran, the Mosaddeghists belong to some Islamic-liberal reformists or secular-nationalist dissidents.

== Key figures ==
=== Early period (1950s) ===
- Hossein Fatemi – Minister of Foreign Affairs, a key martyr of the movement.
- Gholam Hossein Sadighi – Minister of the Interior and a prominent sociologist.

=== Later followers and split (1979–present) ===
Secular faction

- Shapour Bakhtiar – The last Prime Minister of the Pahlavi dynasty who opposed the theocracy.
- Dariush Forouhar – Founder of the Nation Party of Iran.

Religious-liberal faction

- Mehdi Bazargan – First Prime Minister after the revolution, sought to bridge Mosaddeghism with Islam.
- Karim Sanjabi – Leader of the National Front during the revolution.

== Organizations ==
- National Front (1949–present)
- Freedom Movement of Iran (1961–present)
- National Democratic Front (1979–1981)
- National Resistance Movement of Iran (1979–present)

== Criticism ==
Critics believe that Mossadeghism, by placing too much emphasis on fighting foreigners (especially the challenge to the West) and xenophobia to achieve the goals of economic and political independence, has effectively marginalized more important areas such as political and social freedoms in Iran; because the fundamental problem of Iranian society is tyranny and the lack of real democracy. They argue that Mossadeghism, by following populist policies, has founded a discourse that values confrontation instead of development and considers isolation a virtue instead of interaction, and has weakened legalism in Iran, ultimately leading to institutional inefficiency and concentration of power in Iran.

== See also ==
- Liberalism and nationalism
- Resource nationalism
- Secular liberalism
- Khomeinism
- Pahlavism
- Iranian reformists
- Iranian opposition
