= Coalition government of Ahmad Qavam =

- cabinet of Iran

- Date formed: 1 August 1946
- Date dissolved: 16 October 1946

People and organisations
- Head of state: Mohammad Reza Shah
- Head of government: Ahmad Qavam
- No. of ministers: 13
- Member parties: Democrat Party; Tudeh Party; Iran Party

History
- Predecessor: Qavam VI

Prime Minister Ahmad Qavam formed a short-lived coalition government on 1 August 1946 with his Democrat Party of Iran and the left-wing Tudeh Party and Iran Party. He offered three portfolios (Health, culture, and trade and industry) to the communists and gave the ministries of finance and communications to two royalists; while maintained his own control over interior and foreign ministries.

According to Ervand Abrahamian, Qavam did not consult the Shah before forming his cabinet. Shah ordered Qavam to resign on 16 October 1946. Following the resignation, Qavam formed another cabinet without Tudeh and Iran parties.

== Cabinet ==
Cabinet members
Portfolio	Minister	Took office	Left office	Party
Prime Minister	Ahmad Qavam	1 August 1946	16 October 1946	Democrat Party
Foreign Minister	Ahmad Qavam	1 August 1946	16 October 1946	Democrat Party
Interior Minister	Ahmad Qavam	1 August 1946	16 October 1946	Democrat Party
Agriculture Minister	Shamseddin Amir-Alaei	1 August 1946	16 October 1946	Iran Party
Culture Minister	Fereydoun Keshavarz	1 August 1946	16 October 1946	Tudeh Party
Finance Minister	Abdolhossein Hazhir	1 August 1946	16 October 1946	Royalist
Justice Minister	Allahyar Saleh	1 August 1946	16 October 1946	Iran Party
Labor Minister	Mozaffar Firouz	1 August 1946	16 October 1946	Democrat Party
Post & Telegraph Minister	Manouchehr Eghbal	1 August 1946	16 October 1946	Royalist
Public Health Minister	Morteza Yazdi	1 August 1946	16 October 1946	Tudeh Party
Roads Minister	Hossein Firouz	1 August 1946	16 October 1946	Military
Trade and Industry Minister	Iraj Eskandari	1 August 1946	16 October 1946	Tudeh Party
War Minister	Ahmad Amir-Ahmadi	1 August 1946	16 October 1946	Military
Minister without portfolio	Anoushirvan Sepahbodi	1 August 1946	16 October 1946	Nonpartisan
