= 1888 in Iran =

- Decades
- See also: Other events of 1888; Years in Iran

The following lists events that happened during 1888 in Qajar era.

== Incumbents ==
- Monarch: Naser al-Din Shah Qajar

== Births ==
- February 22 – Ervand Kogbetliantz, Armenian mathematician.
- ? – Ahmad Ali Sepehr, Iranian politician and historian.
- ? – Anoushirvan Sepahbodi, Iranian politician and diplomat.
- ? – Avetis Sultan-Zade, Persian-born ethnic Armenian communist and economist.
- ? – Ebrahim Zand, Iranian politician.
- ? – Mirza Mahdi Ashtiani, Iranian philosopher.
- ? – Morteza Yazdanpanah, Iranian politician.
- ? – Musa bey Rafiyev, Azerbaijani politician.
- ? – Rostam Giv, Iranian politician.
- ? – Zia ol Din Tabatabaee, Prime Minister of Iran.

== Deaths ==
- ? – Parviz Mirza (Qajar prince), Iranian Qajar-era prince.
