= Allah-Yar Saleh =

Iranian politician (1897–1981)

- اللهیار صالح
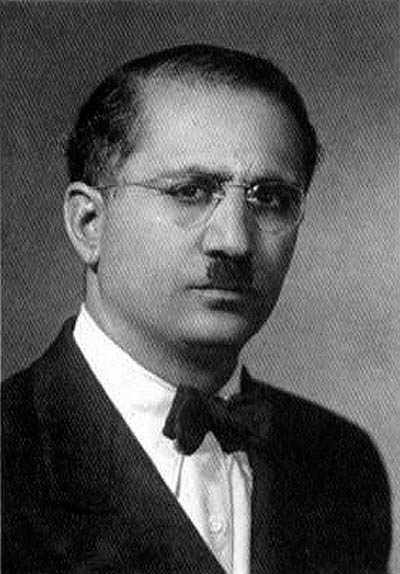

Ambassador of Iran to the United States
- In office 18 September 1952 – 19 August 1953
- Prime Minister: Mohammad Mosaddegh
- Preceded by: Nasrollah Entezam
- Succeeded by: Abbas Aram

Member of Parliament of Iran
- In office 22 February 1961 – 9 May 1961
- Constituency: Kashan
- Majority: 25,078 (99.8%)
- In office 9 February 1950 – 19 February 1952 Serving with Kazem Sheibani
- Constituency: Kashan
- Majority: 15,171 (94.7%)

Minister of Interior
- In office June 1952 – July 1952
- Prime Minister: Mohammad Mosaddegh
- Preceded by: Amirteymour Kalali
- Succeeded by: Gholam Hossein Sadighi
- In office 25 December 1945 – 17 February 1946
- Prime Minister: Ebrahim Hakimi
- Preceded by: Khalil Fahimi
- Succeeded by: Ahmad Qavam

Minister without portfolio
- In office 6 November 1945 – 25 December 1945
- Prime Minister: Ebrahim Hakimi

Minister of Justice
- In office 3 August 1946 – 16 October 1946
- Prime Minister: Ahmad Qavam
- Preceded by: Anoushiravan Sepahbodi
- Succeeded by: Ali-Akbar Mousavi-Zadeh
- In office 13 May 1945 – 3 June 1945
- Prime Minister: Ebrahim Hakimi
- Preceded by: Hassan-Ali Kamal Hedayat
- Succeeded by: Mostafa Adl
- In office 2 September 1944 – 9 November 1944
- Prime Minister: Mohammad Sa'ed
- Preceded by: Asadullah Mamaghani
- Succeeded by: Mostafa Adl

Minister of Finance
- In office 26 January 1943 – 22 April 1943
- Prime Minister: Ahmad Qavam; Ali Soheili
- Preceded by: Bagher Kazemi
- Succeeded by: Morteza-Qoli Bayat

Personal details
- Born: Saleh Arani; 16 May 1897 Aran va Bidgol, Sublime State of Iran
- Died: 1 April 1981 (aged 83) Tehran, Iran
- Party: Iran Party; National Front
- Education: American College of Tehran

Allah-Yar Saleh (Persian: اللهیار صالح, born Saleh Arani; 1897–1981) was an Iranian politician and diplomat who was Iranian Ambassador to the United States during Mohammad Mosaddegh's premiership.

== Career ==
Allah-Yar Saleh was a member of the Iran Party, which was founded in 1946 as a platform for Iranian liberals and was one of the four main parties which made up the National Front. He was later made leader of National Front during 1960–1964.

Party political offices
Preceded by Ahmad Zirakzadeh	Secretary-general of the Iran Party; 1944–Unknown	Succeeded by Abolfazl Qassemi
Preceded by Mohammad Mossadegh	Leader of the National Front; 1960–1964	Vacant Title next held by Karim Sanjabi
