= Hossein Yazdi =

Iranian informer and journalist

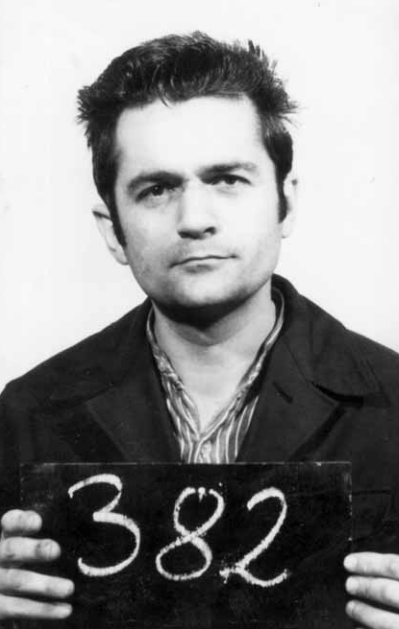
- Born: 22 September 1934
- Died: 5 February 2021 (aged 86)
- Occupations: Translator; Party staff member; Informant
- Known for: Being a SAVAK infiltrator inside the Tudeh Party of Iran
- Parent: Morteza Yazdi (father)

Hossein Yazdi (22 September 1934 – 5 February 2021) was an Iranian individual who is known for his reported role as a SAVAK informant inside the Tudeh Party of Iran while residing in East Germany, and later for his alleged involvement among monarchist circles and opponents of the Islamic Republic. He has been described as one of the most prominent figures associated with espionage in modern Iranian history. His experiences were recounted in the book Espionage in the Party: The Yazdi Brothers and the Tudeh Party of Iran, which narrates the story of his involvement. His father, Morteza Yazdi, was a prominent member of the Tudeh Party in Iran.

== Joining the Tudeh Party ==
Hossein, along with his brother Fereydun, was sent to East Germany in 1954–55 to continue his studies, attending universities in Dresden and East Berlin. From the beginning of his arrival in East Germany, he was trusted by the party leadership due to the reputation of his father, and formally joined the Tudeh Party. He served as translator and driver for senior party leaders, including Reza Roosta and Reza Radmanesh (First Secretary of the Tudeh Party), both of whom placed strong trust in him.
