= Abolfazl Qassemi =

Iranian politician

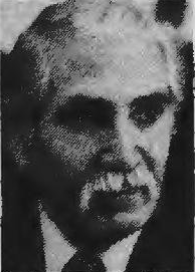

Member-elect of the Iranian Parliament
- In office Credentials rejected in 1980
- Constituency: Dargaz

Personal details
- Born: c. 1921 Dargaz, Iran
- Died: 1993 (aged 71–72) Tehran, Iran
- Party: Iran Party (1946–1993); Motherland Party (before 1946)
- Other political affiliations: National Front

Abolfazl Qassemi (Persian: ابوالفضل قاسمی) was an Iranian politician affiliated with the National Front, and once head librarian of University of Tehran.

Amidst Iranian Revolution, Qassemi succeeded Shapour Bakhtiar as the leader of Iran Party and was elected to the Parliament in 1980 legislative election. However, he was denied to take his seat on the grounds that he was a member of the SAVAK, while he denied the accusation. In November 1981, Islamic Revolutionary Court convicted Qassemi of collaboration with 1980 coup d'état attempt and sentenced him to life imprisonment.

Party political offices
Preceded by Shapour Bakhtiar	Secretary-General of Iran Party; 1979–1993	Vacant Title next held by Nezameddin Movahed
