= Atash (newspaper) =

Newspaper in Iran(1946–1947)

- Type: Weekly newspaper; Daily newspaper
- Owner: Mehdi Mir-Ashrafi
- Editor: Mehdi Mir-Ashrafi
- Founded: 18 April 1946
- Ceased publication: June 1947
- Political alignment: Right-wing
- Language: Persian
- Headquarters: Tehran
- Country: Iran

Atash (Persian: آتش, lit. 'The Fire') was a right-wing Persian-language newspaper published from 1946 to 1947 in Tehran, Iran.

== History and profile ==
Atash was first published on 18 April 1946 as a weekly newspaper. The license holder and editor was Mehdi Mir Ashrafi who was elected to the Majlis during the premiership of Mohammad Mosaddegh and was a close friend of General Hasan Arfa. The paper was based in Tehran and frequently featured political satire and cartoons. Atash had a right-wing political stance and was the only outspoken publication at that period in Iran. It was also one of the fierce critics of Iranian Prime Minister Ahmad Qavam and his cabinet.

Due to its critical approach Atash was banned in May and July 1946. Publication resumed in October 1946, when it became a daily newspaper. From that date it began to criticize the economic policies adopted by the government which led to its suppression in December 1946 and in February 1947. The paper ceased publication in June 1947 following its latest ban by the Qavam government. The official reason for the closure of Atash was the publication of articles against the interests of the country.
