= Persian nationalism =

Political ideology

Persian nationalism was most pronounced as a state ideology under the Imperial State of Iran.

Map of areas where Persian is predominantly spoken as a native language

Persian nationalism (Persian: ملی‌گرایی پارسی) is an ethnonationalist ideology that defines the Persian people, language, and culture as the central foundations of political and national identity in Iran. It emerged in the early 20th century in response to imperial decline and became institutionalized under the Pahlavi dynasty. Distinct from Iranian nationalism, which is typically articulated as a form of civic nationalism encompassing multiple ethnic groups, Persian nationalism is rooted in ethnolinguistic criteria. As a result, scholars have argued that it may at times marginalize non-Persian identities by framing them as regional or secondary to Persian-centric identity. Persian nationalism was most strongly pronounced as a state ideology during the reign of Reza Shah Pahlavi.

The ideology places strong emphasis on Iran's pre-Islamic antiquity, particularly the Achaemenid and Sasanian empires, which are portrayed as a golden age of national civilization. Historical figures and symbols such as Cyrus the Great and Persepolis are commonly invoked to establish continuity between ancient Persia and the modern Iranian state.

== History ==
=== Qajar dynasty ===
Under Qajar rule, Persianization was implemented to a limited extent, with the 1906 constitution establishing Persian as the sole official language of Iran and requiring all members of parliament to be proficient in the language. The following year, a constitutional amendment implemented compulsory education in Persian.

=== Pahlavi dynasty ===
With the rise of Reza Shah Pahlavi in 1925, Persian nationalism became a central instrument of state power, framed by the motto of "one nation, one language, one country." Modern Iranian national identity was closely tied to the Persian language, which was promoted as the primary marker of unity. State policies and practices reflected systematic repression of non-Persian peoples, including Kurds, Arabs, Lurs, Qashqai, and Bakhtiari. Under Reza Shah's rule, the Imperial state of Iran emphasized cultural and linguistic homogenization, promoting the Persian language as a symbol of national unity while restricting the public use of minority languages. State policies disproportionately benefited Persian-dominated regions, contributing to the political and economic marginalization of ethnic minorities. Reza Shah's successor, Mohammea Reza Pahlavi, allowed limited use of minority languages within tightly regulated settings, while Persian remained dominant. As non-Persian languages were confined to private spheres without legal protection, the usual result was language loss. Persian elites continued marginalizing them as "regional dialects." Zoroastrian symbols were often promoted by the state to connect Iran to its ancient pre-Islamic past.

Nationalist thought expanded from anti-Arab sentiment to broader hostility toward non-Persian identities. Persianism and Shia Islam emerged as the ideological foundations of Iranian nationalism, shaping what scholars describe as a "Persian psycho-nationalist habitus." Thinkers such as Jalal Al-e-Ahmad and Taqi Arani, who advanced racialized theories of language and nationhood, further institutionalized the idea of Persian as the unifying and authentic essence of the Iranian nation-state.

Scholars such as Alex Shams argue that this period marked the institutionalization of a Persian-centric national identity that downplayed Iran's historical ethnic diversity. According to Shams, Reza Shah's regime drew on Aryanist and pre-Islamic symbolism to frame Persian identity as the core of the nation, while overlooking the multiethnic foundations of earlier Iranian empires, which were historically unified through imperial governance rather than ethnic homogeneity.

=== Islamic Republic ===
Following the 1979 Iranian Revolution, the Islamic Republic shifted Iranian identity from the secular Persian nationalism of the Pahlavi era to Shia Islamism. At the same time, elements of Persian-centric nationalism persisted within state discourse and governance, alongside efforts to promote a more uniform Iranian nationalism reflective of all the diverse ethnicities in Iran. In contrast to the Pahlavi monarchy's emphasis on ethnic and linguistic homogenization, the Islamic Republic's exclusionary practices have been more strongly articulated along sectarian and religious lines, particularly through discrimination against Sunni Muslims and non-Muslim communities.

With the rise of discontent with the Islamic republic in the 2020s in the wake of sanctions and conflicts with Saudi Arabia and Israel, nationalists began to become more critical of Islam’s role in Iranian society. Some were moderates, who wanted secularization and the removal of strict laws, while others purportedly desired to remove most orthodox Islamic influence from Iranian society.

In 2023, Mohammad Abolghassem Doulabi, a senior cleric for Iranian President Ebrahim Raisi, cited various possible factors for the decline in Islamic worship, including but not limited to misuse of religious funds which led to poverty in some places by the Iranian government and some institutions. Doulabi also stated that ever since the Islamic Revolution that reshaped Iranian society, religion and the government were both very deeply intertwined, and as such many ordinary Iranians of all backgrounds tended to associate one with the other.

== See also ==
- Iranian nationalism
- Persia proper
- Persianate society
- Persianization
- Pan-Iranism
- Greater Iran
