= Karim Sanjabi =

Founder of the Iranian National Front

- کریم سنجابی
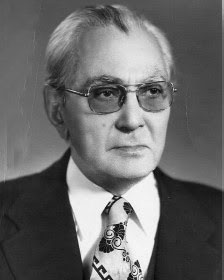

Minister of Foreign Affairs
- In office 11 February 1979 – 1 April 1979
- Prime Minister: Mehdi Bazargan
- Preceded by: Ahmad Mirfendereski
- Succeeded by: Ebrahim Yazdi

Member of the Parliament
- In office 27 April 1952 – 16 August 1953
- Constituency: Kermanshah

Minister of Culture
- In office 28 April 1951 – 6 May 1951
- Prime Minister: Mohammad Mosaddegh
- Preceded by: Mahmoud Mehran
- Succeeded by: Mahmoud Hessabi

Personal details
- Born: 11 September 1905 Kermanshah, Qajar Iran
- Died: 4 July 1995 (aged 89) Carbondale, Illinois, United States
- Party: National Front
- Other political affiliations: Iran Party; Motherland Party
- Spouse: Fakhrolmolouk Ardalan Sanjabi
- Children: 4
- Education: Sorbonne University, Faculty of Law
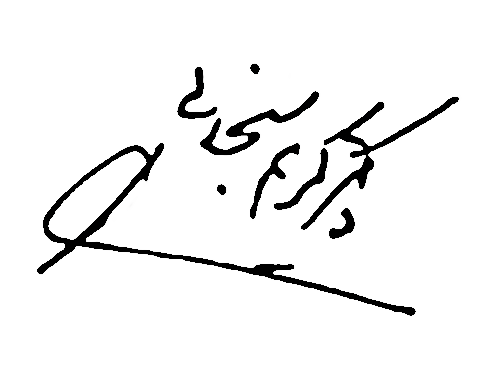
- Signature

Karim Bakhtiar Sanjabi (Persian: کریم بختیار سنجابی; September 11, 1905 – July 4, 1995) was an Iranian politician and a member of The National Consultative Assembly. He was also a professor at Tehran University Law School and one of the leaders of Iran National Front and Iran Party. Sanjabi was also considered the Minister of Culture in the government of Mohammad Mosaddegh and the Minister of Foreign Affairs of Iran in the government of Mahdi Bazargan.

== Early life ==
He was born in Kermanshah in September 1905 to the chief of the Kurdish Sanjâbi tribe. He studied law and politics at Sorbonne University. He worked as a law professor at the University of Tehran.

== Career ==
Sanjabi and Allahyar Saleh led the Iran Party, a nationalist, progressive, leftist and anti-Soviet group, in the 1950s. The party became part of the National Front. Sanjabi was a loyal supporter of Mohammad Mossadegh and he later served as minister of education under Mossadegh in 1952. Mossadegh had led the movement to nationalize the British-controlled oil industry in Iran (which, after nationalization, became known as the National Iranian Oil Company) and after this was accomplished, he became engaged in a heated battle with the British (who had previously controlled the oil industry and wished to reassert control over it) and with the forces rallying around Mohammad Reza Shah (the king of Iran who was opposed to Mossadegh's policies vis-a-vis the British, as well as the prime minister's efforts at limiting the Shah's power and influence). After a CIA-MI6 coup d'état overthrew Mossadegh in August 1953, Sanjabi, along with other Mossadegh supporters, went into opposition against the Shah's regime. He was heavily involved in the formation of the Second National Front in 1960. The reconstituted National Front was to remain active for five years, but under increasingly worsening circumstances. Despite its moderate demands for electoral reforms and a Shah that would "reign and not rule", the Shah refused to tolerate the Front's activities. His powerful security forces, most notably the SAVAK, silenced the likes of Sanjabi and other secular democrats. Due to this and a variety of other factors, it had dissolved by 1965. The Front was to remain dormant until the late 1970s. It was revived in late 1977 by Sanjabi as its leader.

As the general secretary of the National Front during the revolutionary uprising of 1978–1979, Sanjabi and his colleagues initially wished to negotiate a peaceful solution with the Shah. However, on 3 November 1978, he met as representative of the National Front with Ayatollah Ruhollah Khomeini in France. He had gone there hoping to convince Khomeini to support the creation of a coalition government headed by the National Front. Despite the rising revolutionary fervor, Sanjabi and a number of other liberals had remained loyal to the idea of a constitutional monarchy with the Shah as ceremonial figurehead and they wished to bring Khomeini over to their point of view. Khomeini, however, refused to budge and reiterated his demand for the overthrow of the monarchy. In the end, Sanjabi, acting as head of the National Front, capitulated to Khomeini's demands. In addition, he accepted the leadership of Khomeini and opposed to the alliance with the Tudeh party. Sanjabi emerged from his meeting "with a short declaration that spoke of both Islam and democracy as basic principles", and Sanjabi declared his support for Khomeini and joined his forces.

After the overthrow of the monarchy on 11 February 1979, Khomeini "explicitly refused to put the same word, democracy, into either the title of the Republic or its constitution." Sanjabi served as the foreign minister of the provisional government led by Mehdi Bazargan between 11 February and 1 April 1979, replacing Ahmad Mirfendereski in the post. Sanjabi believed and stated that without resolving the Palestinian issue there shall be no peace in the region. Sanjabi also condemned Shahpour Bakhtiar for accepting the Prime minister position offer by the Shah. He was replaced by Ebrahim Yazdi as minister of foreign affairs in April.

=== Attacks and arrests ===
Sanjabi's house in Tehran was bombed on 8 April 1978. The underground committee for revenge, a state-financed organization, proclaimed the responsibility of the bombing. He was arrested on 11 November 1978 and freed on 6 December.

== Personal life ==
Sanjabi was married to Fakhrolmolouk Ardalan Sanjabi (7 September 1921 - 21 February 2011) and had four children, three sons and a daughter. Khosrow, Parviz, Saeed and Maryam.

== Later years and death ==
Sanjabi left Iran in 1982 and went to Paris. Later he settled in the US. He died on 4 July 1995 at his home in Carbondale, Illinois, at the age of 89.

== Sources ==
- Siavoshi, Sussan, Liberal Nationalism in Iran: The Failure of a Movement, Westview Press, 1990.

Political offices
| Preceded by Ahmad Mirfendereski | Foreign Minister of Iran; 1979 | Succeeded by Ebrahim Yazdi |
Party political offices
| Vacant Title last held by Allahyar Saleh | Leader of National Front; 1967–1988 | Vacant Title next held by Adib Boroumand |
