= National Resistance Movement of Iran =

National Movement of the Iranian Resistance
- Abbreviation: NAMIR
- Founder: Shapour Bakhtiar
- Founded: Summer 1979 (initial activity); August 1980 (Official)
- Headquarters: Paris, France
- Ideology: Liberalism (Iranian); Laïcité
- Political position: Centre-left
- Slogan: "Iran Will Never Die"

Website
- https://www.namir.info/

The National Movement of the Iranian Resistance (NAMIR; Persian: نهضت مقاومت ملی ایران) was a political organization founded by Shapour Bakhtiar in 1979.

NAMIR was inspired by the resistance movement that emerged immediately after the 1953 Iranian coup d'état, taking its name from there. In 1979, the National Resistance Movement of Iran was founded by Shapoor Bakhtiar and a group of pro-opposition figures to fight against the ruling regime in Iran. Its purpose is to achieve the following goals: Establishing a government based on national sovereignty and social justice; Separation of religion from government in all aspects of the country; Maintaining the independence and territorial integrity of the country and national solidarity.

NAMIR considered its struggle in the sequence of the struggles of the National Movement of Iran and the National Front. The struggles that have been ongoing since the beginning of the constitutional revolution until today to achieve the demands of the Iranian nation, namely democracy, independence, territorial integrity, and law-based military establishment. NAMIR considered itself one of the guardians of the national movement of Iran and in turn tries to make a more effective contribution to the struggle of the Iranian nation to build a free and prosperous Iran by expanding the range of activities and uniting with other Iranian nationalists.

== Leadership ==
Other than Bakhtiar, who was the leader of the party, three senior members served in the capacity of the Chairman of Executive Committee: Abdolrahman Boroomand (1980–1987; March–August 1991) Mohammad Moshiri (March 1987–July 1989), Sadegh Sadireh (July 1989–March 1991).

== Publishers ==
The National Resistance Movement of Iran had a newspaper, and also had a weekly magazine called Qiyam Iran edited by Iraj Pezeshkzad for ten years.

== Operation Niqab (Saving the uprising of Great Iran)[Nojeh coup plot] ==
In Iran, a group called "Naqab" was formed from army officers and some civilians. They expressed concern about the consolidation of a new dictatorship in Iran and supported Bakhtiar as the true leader of Mossadegh and the leader of democracy. On July 16, 1359 (1980), the Iranian authorities claimed that they had destroyed a network of military and civilian supporters of Bakhtiar who were conspiring to overthrow the Islamic regime. During the following months, more than one hundred people were executed for being members of "Naqab" and supporting Bakhtiar and the Iranian National Resistance Movement.

== Response by the Islamic Republic ==
Shapour Bakhtiar, the founder of Iran's National Resistance Movement, was the target of an unsuccessful assassination attempt in the summer of 1359 by a group led by Anis Naghash. According to the statements of Anis Naqash, both assassination attempts were planned by the order of the authorities of the Islamic Republic of Iran and with the help of professional terrorists.

Soroush Katibeh was the special secretary of Dr. Shapour Bakhtiar and a member of the Iranian National Resistance Movement, who was murdered by three criminals on August 6, 1991, along with Dr. Shapour Bakhtiar, in his residence in Soren, a suburb of Paris.

Abdur Rahman Boroumand (born in 1306 in Isfahan - 1370 in Paris) was an Iranian political activist and the head of the executive board of the National Resistance Movement of Iran. He was stabbed to death in front of the elevator of his residence in Paris on Thursday, April 29, 1370 (April 18, 1991).

Colonel Hadi Aziz Moradi Kurd, after the defeat of the uprising on the 27th of Tir, 1359 (known as the "Nojeh coup"), due to his active and direct role in this plan, he went to Turkey and then to France at the end of Tir 1359 and joined the military branch. Iran's national resistance movement joined. He was shot dead by three unknown people on the 2nd of Dey, 1364 (December 23, 1985), while leaving his home in Bakirkoy area, Yeni neighborhood in Istanbul city.

Captain Behrouz Shahverdiloo (born in 1321 in Rezaieh) was one of the former officers of the Imperial Army of Iran, who went abroad after the 1357 revolution and joined the military branch of the Iranian National Resistance Movement. He was assassinated in Istanbul, Turkey on 25th of Mordad 1364 (August 16, 1985).
