= Morteza Yazdi =

Iranian physician and politician

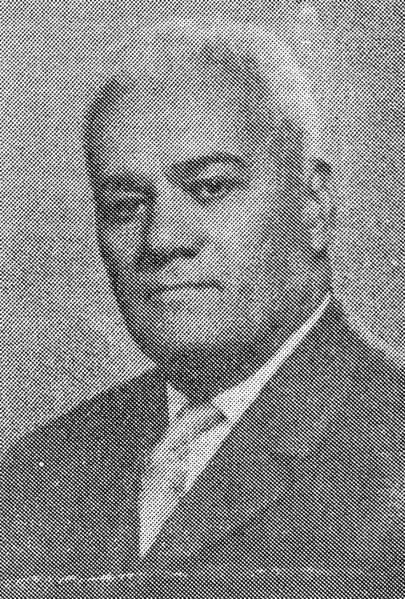

Minister of Health
- In office 1 August 1946 – 16 October 1946
- Prime Minister: Ahmad Qavam

Personal details
- Born: 1907 Yazd, Persia
- Died: 1980 decades
- Party: Tudeh Party (1941–1954)
- Other political affiliations: Communist Party
- Relatives: Ebrahim Hakimi (foster father)
- Education: Berlin University

Morteza Yazdi (Persian: مرتضی یزدی) was an Iranian surgeon and communist politician.

== Early life and education ==
Yazdi was born into a senior clerical family in 1907 in Yazd. His father was a senior cleric who contributed to the Persian Constitutional Revolution. Following death of his father, Ebrahim Hakimi served as his foster father. He studied medicine at Berlin University, and was associated with Taqi Arani during his presence in Berlin. Following his return to Iran, he became involved with the Communist Party of Persia and subsequently was arrested as one of "The Fifty-Three".

== Career ==
Yazdi was among co-founders of the Tudeh Party of Iran in 1941. Then he became a member of the party's central council, and belonged to the party's moderate faction.

He ran for a Tehran seat in the 1944 parliamentary election to no avail, garnering 4,719 out of some 41,000 votes (about 11.5%).

Yazdi was named as the health minister in the Coalition government of Ahmad Qavam in 1946. In 1949, he was sentenced to 5 years of imprisonment after the party was banned.

In 1954, he was arrested again, and he was sentenced to death for his activities; however, his punishment was reduced to imprisonment. After his release, he was no longer active within the party though he remained on friendly terms with them as late as 1979.
