= Javad Ameri =

Iranian politician (1891–1980)

Mirza Javad Khan Ameri
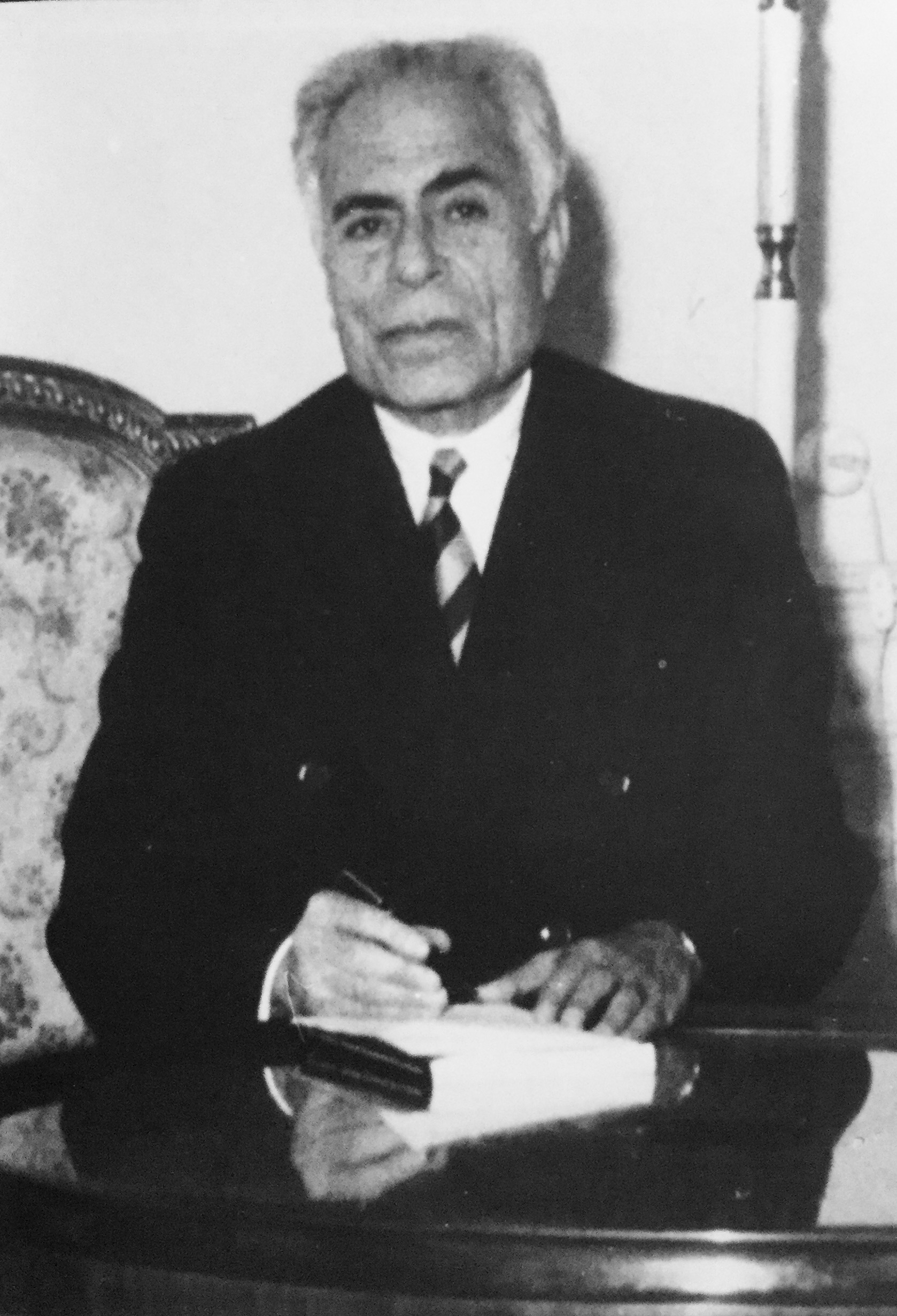

Member of the Iranian Parliament for Semnan and Dameghan
- In office 1944–1953

Personal details
- Born: 1891 Semnan, Qajar Iran
- Died: 10 January 1980 (aged 88–89) Tehran, Iran
- Education: Sorbonne

Javad Ameri (Persian: جواد عامری; 1891 – 10 January 1980; better known as Mirza Javad Khan Ameri) was an Iranian politician. He served as member of Parliament for Semnan and Dameghan from 1944 until 1953. He was previously acting minister of foreign affairs, minister of justice and minister of the interior.

== Early life ==
Ameri was born in Semnan, Iran, in 1891. After the death of his father Mirza Abol-Hassan Khan (Moinolmamalek), when encroachments by rival families against his family and their estates increased, Gohar Khanoum, Ameri's mother, moved her family of three sons and one daughter (Nayereh, Javad, Mehdi and Massoud) to Tehran.

Ameri, who belonged to a learned family, started his schooling at the age of five. He continued his elementary and secondary education in Tehran, attending the well-known Aghdassieh School. He then attended the Advanced School of Political Science – at the time one of two schools of higher education in Tehran, the other one being the famous Dar ol-Fonun.

In order to continue his studies, Ameri left Iran for France and studied law at the Sorbonne, finishing his studies at the age of 23. This coincided with the beginning of World War I and the forced repatriation of foreign students from France.

== Career ==
On the insistence of Adolphe Perney, the French legal advisor to the Iranian Ministry of Justice, Ameri accepted to enter the service of the Ministry and act as Perney's deputy. In 1919, Nosrat od-Dowleh Firouz, the minister of justice, decided to establish an Advanced School of Law in order to provide the department and the legal profession with qualified personnel and competent lawyers, respectively.

Since Perney did not speak Persian, the main burden of establishing the School fell on Ameri's shoulders. While working at the Justice Ministry and assuming the management of the Law School, he also taught a number of courses, including Private International Law, Commercial Law and Criminal Law.

Ameri was rising through the ranks in the Ministry of Justice, but in 1937, the Foreign Minister asked Reza Shah to allow Ameri's transfer to the Ministry of Foreign Affairs. In the Foreign Ministry, first he replaced the French legal advisor who had previously left Iran. Subsequently, he was appointed Director-General for Internal Affairs, Director-General for Political Matters, Deputy Foreign Minister and finally acting Minister of Foreign Affairs.

In 1941, at the time of the Anglo-Soviet invasion of Iran, Ameri was responsible for the Ministry of Foreign Affairs and thus played a key role in the subsequent developments. Shortly thereafter, since presence of foreign troops on Iranian soil had caused major internal problems, Rezā Shāh ordered Ameri to assume the responsibilities of the Minister of Interior.

After Rezā Shāh's abdication, in one of Ghavam-Saltaneh's cabinets, Ameri became Minister of Justice and subsequently Minister of Interior again. Leaving the service of government, he ran for Parliament and became MP for Semnan and Dameghan. He was reelected to the Parliament three more times (14th to 17th sessions). While he was an MP, Prime Minister Ghavam asked him to join the delegation he was heading to Moscow as No.2. The mission of this delegation was to have discussions with Stalin in order to arrange an end to the continued occupation of Azarbaijan by the Soviet Union.

After the 1953 coup against the legal government of the day, headed by Dr. Mossaddegh, the Shah prevented Ameri from running for Parliament again. Returning to government service Ameri assumed the positions of Attorney-General (Prosecutor-General) and Ambassador to Austria, retiring in 1960.

Ameri died in Tehran on 10 January 1980 at the age of 89.

== Personal life ==
In 1935, Ameri had a son, Houshang.
