= National Will Party =

- Leader: Zia'eddin Tabatabaee
- Chairman: Hedayat family
- Founded: September 1943 as Vatan Party; 19 January 1944 as National Will Party
- Dissolved: November 1951
- Newspaper: Raʿd-e emrūz
- Ideology: Iranian nationalism Fascism; Conservatism; Anti-communism
- Political position: Right-wing

The Party of the National Will or National Will Party (Persian: حزب اراده ملی, romanized: Ḥezb-e Erāda-ye Mellī), formerly named Vatan Party (Persian: حزب وطن, romanized: Ḥezb-e Waṭan, lit. 'Fatherland or Homeland') and Halqa Party (Persian: حزب حلقه, romanized: Ḥezb-e Ḥalqa, lit. 'ring, circle, link'), was an Anglophile political party in Iran, led by Zia'eddin Tabatabaee. The party played an important role in anti-communist activities, specifically against the Tudeh Party of Iran and was rival to other leftists and civic nationalists who later emerged as the National Front.

Widely regarded as dedicated to promoting British influence in Iran, it enjoyed support from the Embassy of the United Kingdom and British agents such as Robert Charles Zaehner. After the British indecisive policy as a result of the Labour Party victory in the 1945 elections, the party was demoralized and went on hiatus in February 1946 when its key members were arrested by Prime Minister Ahmad Qavam. The party returned in September 1951 to oppose Mohammad Mosaddegh and the nationalization of the Iran oil industry movement, but collapsed after two months.
