= Ahmad Ali Sepehr =

Iranian historian and politician (1889–1976)

- Born: Movarrekh al-Dowleh; 1889; Tehran, Qajar Iran
- Died: 1976 (aged 86–87); Tehran, Pahlavi Iran
- Resting place: Behesht-e Zahra

Ahmad Ali Sepehr (Persian: احمدعلی سپهر; 1889 – 1976) also known as Movarrekh al-Dowleh (Persian: مورخ‌الدوله) was an Iranian historian and politician. He held several government posts during both the Qajar and Pahlavi eras.

== Early life and education ==
Sepehr was born in Tehran in 1889. His grandfather was Mohammad Taqi Sepehr, a historian during the rule of Naser al-Din Shah Qajar.

Sepehr graduated from the Jewish Alliance school, a secondary education institution in Iran. He received higher education under French professors hired by Ahmad Shah Qajar. Sepehr was fluent in several European languages, including German and French.

== Career ==
During the Qajar era, Sepehr worked as a translator at the customs office and became the head of the translation office. In 1914, he was appointed first secretary of the German Embassy in Tehran, and with the outbreak of World War I he began to shape Germany's policies in relation to Iran. At the same time, he chaired the board of directors of the Iran-Russia Fisheries Company. He then emigrated from the country and returned after the end of the war. In 1916, he was awarded the title of Movarrekh al-Dowleh due to his family's services to the study of history. Sepehr then held the following positions: head of the North Tehran Registry Office, head of the Ministry of Finance, minister of state, and head of the Administrative Courts at the Ministry of Finance.

In 1942, Sepehr was elected as a deputy and became acting minister of crafts and arts in the cabinet of Ali Soheili. In the 1940s, he was again made the chair of the Fisheries Board and played a significant role in the nationalization of fisheries. Sepehr was one of the supporters of Ahmad Qavam who succeeded Mohammad Mosaddegh as prime minister. Sepehr served as the minister of trade and industry in the first cabinet of Qavam in 1946. However, Sepehr was fired by Qavam soon and was sent to exile in Kashan.

== Work, recognition and death ==
Sepehr was the author of several books, including Iran in the Great War. In 1918, he was awarded by Ahmad Shah the Order of the Lion and the Sun. He died in Tehran in 1976 and was buried in the Behesht-e Zahra cemetery.
