= United Front of Progressive Parties =

- Founded: June 1946
- Dissolved: 1948
- Political position: Left-wing

Coalition Front of Freedom-Seeking Parties or United Front of Progressive Parties (Persian: جبهه مؤتلف احزاب آزادی‌خواه, romanized: Jebha-ye Moʾtalef-e Ahzāb-e Āāzādī-ḵᵛāh) was a political alliance of left-wing parties in Iran from 1946 to 1948.

Having originally been founded by the communist Tudeh Party and the socialist Iran Party, they invited other parties to join them in their alleged struggle for "social progress and national independence". One of the main planks of the united front was to recognize Central Council of United Trade Unions as the sole legitimate organization of the working-class in Iran.

== Member parties ==
- Tudeh Party of Iran (founding member)
- Iran Party (joined in June 1946, left in January 1947)
- Socialist Party (founding member)
- Jungle Party (joined on 29 October 1946)
- Democratic Party of Kurdistan (joined on 29 October 1946)
- Democratic Party of Azerbaijan (joined on 29 October 1946)
