= Iran Unity Party =

- Leader: Shams-od-din Jazayeri
- Founded: 1946
- Split from: Iran Party
- Newspaper: Shafaq
- Ideology: Iranian nationalism Social democracy
- Political position: Centre

The Iran Unity Party (Persian: حزب وحدت ایران, romanized: Ḥezb-e Waḥdat-e Irān) was a socialist political party in Iran. It split the Iran Party following its alliance with the communist Tudeh Party of Iran in 1946.

According to Leonard Binder, the party was in a coalition with the National Union Party and Socialist Party in the 14th parliament.
