= Iranian nationalism =

Nationalism in Iran

Iranian nationalism (Note: Persian: ملی‌گرایی ایرانی; Balochi: راج دوستی ایرانی; Kurdish: نەتەوە پەروەریی ئێرانی; Gilaki and Mazanderani: ایجانایی ایرانی; Azerbaijani: ایران میلتچیلی‌یی; Turkmen: ایرانؽڭ میلتچیل‌یگی; Arabic: القومية الإيرانية; Armenian: ايراناكان آزگايناكاتھيون; Adyghe: يران ࢦپقپس) is a form of nationalism centered on the people of Iran and those who identify as Iranian, encompassing political, social, and cultural movements that emphasize pride in Iranian history, culture, languages, and national unity.

National consciousness in Iran has ancient roots, drawing from centuries of shared historical memory, including pre-Islamic empires such as the Achaemenid and Sasanian periods. However, modern Iranian nationalism, as a predominant ideological force shaping attitudes and policies, primarily emerged in the late 19th and early 20th centuries. It developed amid Qajar Iran's encounters with European colonialism, internal weaknesses, and the need for reform. Intellectuals like Fath'ali Akhundzadeh and Mirza Aqa Khan Kermani played key roles in articulating ideas that highlighted Iran's pre-Islamic heritage, Aryan origins, linguistic unity around the Persian language, and historical continuity, often critiquing the cultural influence of Islam following the 7th-century Arab conquests as an overlay on an older, indigenous civilization.

The 1905–1911 Persian Constitutional Revolution marked a significant rise in patriotic sentiments and unity across diverse groups. This momentum intensified under the Pahlavi dynasty (1925–1979), particularly during Reza Shah's reign (1925–1941), when nationalism shifted from intellectual discourse to official state policy. The government promoted centralized modernization, including infrastructure projects, military reforms, secular education, and cultural revivalism. Notable initiatives included the 1935 international request that foreign delegates begin using Iran (the native endonym) in formal correspondence, as well as archaeological efforts highlighting sites like Persepolis. These measures aimed to foster cohesion among Iran's multi-ethnic population, including Persians, Azeris, Kurds, and others, though they sometimes involved coercive policies, such as suppressing regional autonomies and prioritizing Persian-centric narratives.

The civil flag of Iran (1964–1980), a plain horizontal tricolour of green, white, and red without any emblem. It was used as the national/civil ensign and remains a universal symbol of Iranian identity for many.

== History ==
=== Origins ===
Iran's politics are first recorded in the twenties of the third century C.E. as an essential feature of Sasanian propaganda.

In the third-century, Iran was shaken by a conflict between universalism and nationalism that was most clearly manifested in the religious and cultural sphere. The outcome of this conflict is well known: the traditionalistic and nationalistic impulses gained the upper hand, and Manichaean universalism succumbed to the nationalism of the Zoroastrian Magi. Iranian identity, which up to that point had essentially consisted of cultural and religious nature, assumed a definite political value, placing Persia and the Persians at the center of the Sasanian Empire. In other words, at the center of a state based on the twin powers of the throne and altar and sustained by an antiquarian and archaizing ideology. This ideology became more and more accentuated during the Sassanian period, reaching its height under the long reign of Khosrow I (531–79 A.D.). Of course, economic and social factors favored the victory of the stronger classes in a society that was based mainly on a rural economy, namely the aristocratic landed and warrior classes and the Magian clergy.

=== Shu'ubiyya ===
Iranian identity came under threat after the fall of the Sasanian Empire and the Muslim conquest of Persia. The term Shu'ubiyya refers to a response by Persian Muslims to the growing Arabization of Islam in the 9th and 10th centuries and discrimination against Iranian people by the occupiers. It was primarily concerned with preserving Persian culture and protecting Persian identity. Some of the famous Iranian Shu'ubi figures are Bashshar ibn Burd, Ismail Nisa'i, Zeyad e Ajam, Hissam ibn Ada, Abulhassan Ali Mada'ini, Abu Hatam Sajestani, Ibrahim ibn Mamshad and Abu Abdullah Muhammad Marzbani. Many consider Ferdowsi a Shu'ubi poet.

=== Iranian Intermezzo ===
The term Iranian Intermezzo (Note: Such an obviously coined designation was introduced by Vladimir Minorsky, "The Iranian Intermezzo", in Studies in Caucasian history (London, 1953) and has been taken up by Bernard Lewis, among others, in his The Middle East: A brief history of the last 2,000 years (New York, 1995).) represents a period in Middle Eastern history that saw the rise of various native Iranian Muslim dynasties on the Iranian Plateau. This term is noteworthy since it was an interlude between the decline of Abbasid rule and the eventual emergence of the Seljuk Turks in the 11th century. The Iranian revival consisted of Iranian support based on Iranian territory and most significantly a revived Iranian national spirit and culture in an Islamic form.

=== Iranian-Shia identity under the Safavids ===
Iran regained its political unity and was given a new distinct religious identity under the Safavids. Shia Islam became the official state religion and henceforth played an important role in the reconstruction of a new ethno-religious identity for the Iranian people. Furthermore, the rise of the Safavid empire coincided with the rise of the neighboring Ottoman Empire in West Asia and North Africa (and most importantly, for centuries Iran's geo-political as well as ideological arch-rival) and the Mughal Empire in the Indian subcontinent, both adhering to Sunni Islam. The formation of these political entities helped create a distinct Iranian-Shia political identity among these polities. It also helped to expand the hegemony of the Persian language in much of the Muslim world. Persian literature was, apart from Iran and its territories stretching from the North Caucasus to the Persian Gulf, produced from the Balkans to Central Asia and the Indian subcontinent.

Flag of Iran

=== Qajar era and the start of modern nationalism ===
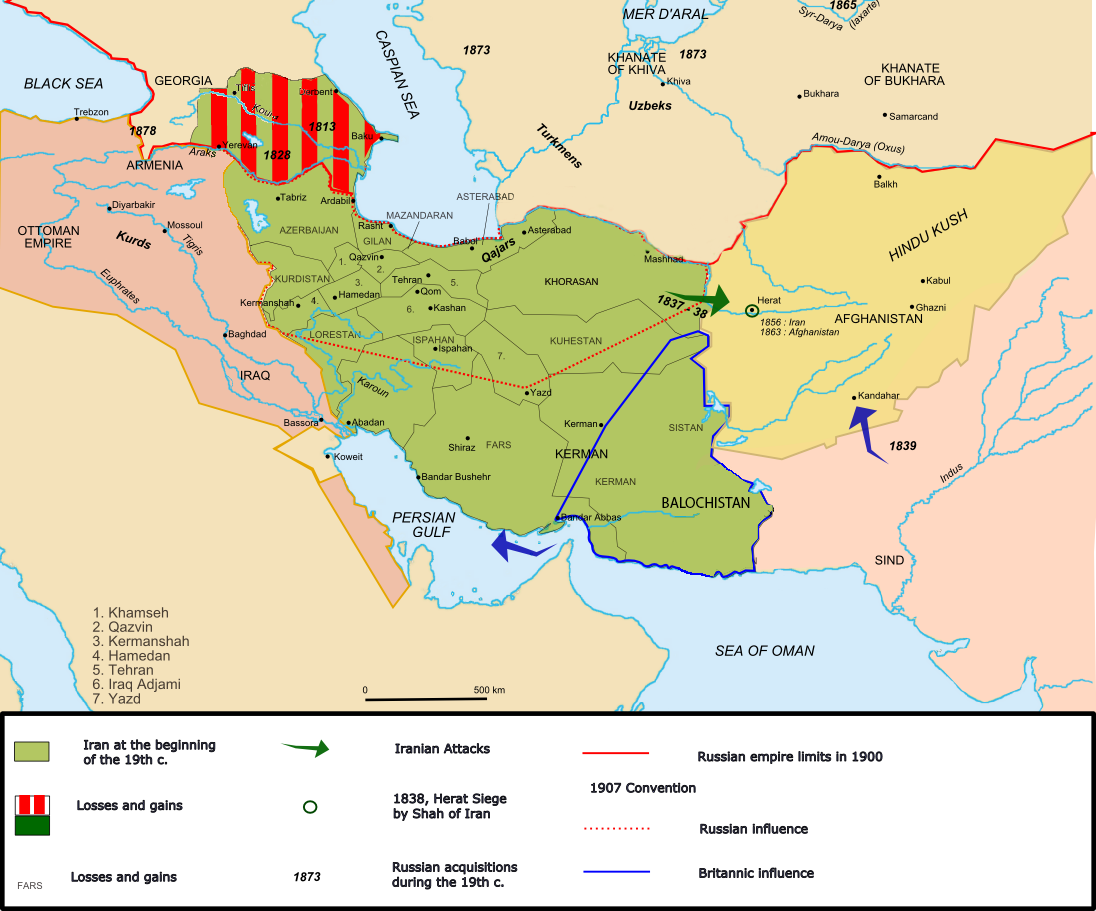
Iran in the 19th century

The state flag of the Imperial State of Iran most prominently used by Iranian expatriates

The modern Iranian national movement began in the late 19th century. This movement was in large part a reaction to 19th-century European colonialism in the region, which led to the loss of Qajar possessions in the Caucasus. In the course of the 19th century, through the Russo-Persian War (1804–1813) and the Russo-Persian War (1826–1828) and the out-coming Treaty of Gulistan and Treaty of Turkmenchay of 1813 and 1828 respectively, Iran was forced to irrevocably cede swaths of its territory in the North and South Caucasus comprising what is now Georgia, Dagestan, Azerbaijan and Armenia to the Russian Empire. These territories had made, for centuries, part of the concept of Iran until their loss.

The initial objectives of these nationalists was to put an end to the feudalistic landholding system, governmental sloth and corruption, and the wholesale distribution of Iranian resources to foreigners.

One of the principal and most noted forerunners of Iranian nationalism during the Qajar era was Mirza Fatali Akhundov, born in the then-recently ceded territories in the Caucasus to a family of landowners originating in Iranian Azerbaijan.

=== Modern nationalism ===
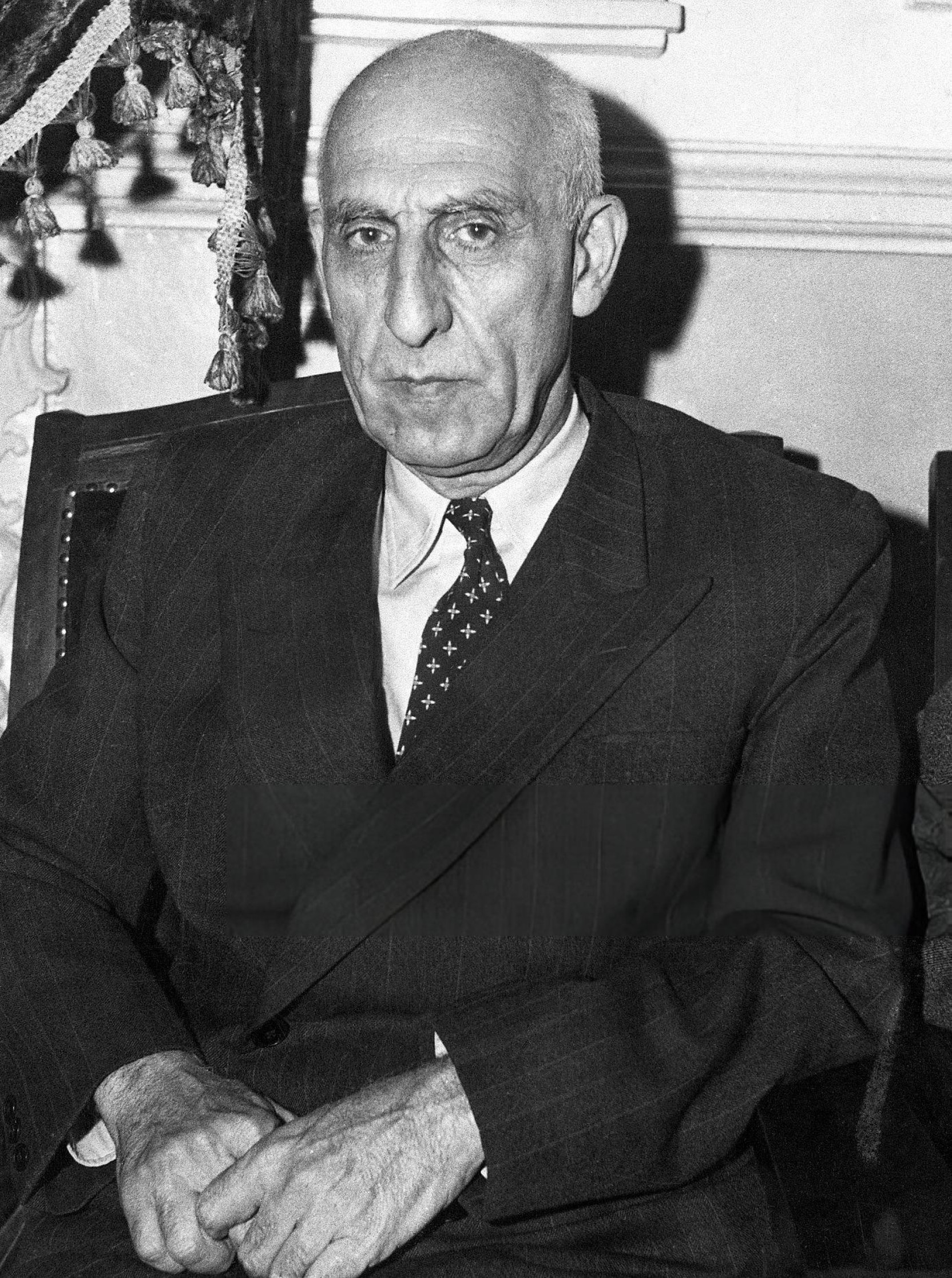
Mohammad Mosaddegh

Modern nationalism in Iran dates back to 1905 when an almost bloodless constitutional revolution created Iran's first parliament. Reza Shah helped shape Iranian nationalism by infusing it with a distinctly secular ideology and diminishing the influence of Islam on Iran. By integrating European legal policies in the place of Islamic courts, Shah reassured the efficiency of the state bureaucracy and promoted a strong sense of Iranian nationalism. However, the nationalism promoted by the Pahlavi dynasty was distinctly Persian nationalist, defining Iranian national identity through Persians and the Persian language as its central foundations and promoting the Persianization of minorities.

In 1935, Reza Shah asked foreign delegates and League of Nations to use the term Iran in formal correspondence. In addition, Reza Shah sought to change the names of various towns to honor pre-Islamic Persian kings and mythological heroes and to continue to reduce the power of the mullahs by seeking to modernize Iran. The Pahlavi dynasty thus was set irrevocably down the road towards infusing the country with a form of secular nationalism, a path that would eventually bring it into conflict with the country's clerical class.

Iranian nationalism was a deciding force in the 1951 movement to nationalize Iran's oil wealth. Mossadegh's goal of nationalizing Iran’s oil came into effect in the year 1951. By allowing Iran to have full power and control over their prime resource, the AIOC and other European programs participated in an international boycott which eventually caused a deter in Iran's economy. After Mossadegh's deposition guided by help from the U.S. and Britain, Reza Shah's son and successor Mohammad Reza Pahlavi retained control and used the increased gas prices to expand modernization in Iran.

Iranian nationalist discourse often focuses on the pre-Islamic history of Iran. In the 20th century, different aspects of this romantic nationalism would be referenced by both the Pahlavi monarchy, which employed titles such as Āryāmehr ('Light of the Aryans'), and by some leaders of the Islamic Republic that followed it.

Despite the secular tendencies of the vast majority of Iranian nationalists, there is a grouping called the Religious Nationalists who are Iranian nationalists but also religious Muslims.

=== Ethnic discontent ===
Iran's 2016 parliamentary elections saw the reformists' victory, signalling support for President Hassan Rouhani's moderate government and the nuclear deal. However, the campaign also focused on addressing the demands of Iran's ethnic minorities, who make up 40-50% of the population. The five major ethnic groups—Azeris, Kurds, Arabs, Baluchis, and Turkmen—have a long history of political struggle for their rights, and many of them are Sunni, in contrast to the country's Shia majority.

Ethnic grievances have been a prominent feature in election rhetoric, with candidates using sharper language to mobilize minority communities. While previous leaders, such as President Khatami in 1997, promised civil rights for all Iranians, these promises often remained unfulfilled, widening the gap between minorities' expectations and their realities.

This pattern of ethnic politicking has undermined Iran by creating divisions between ethnic groups and political factions. The country’s ethnic diversity is also seen as a national security threat, with minority groups living near or across borders, especially in the context of Iran's sectarian rivalry with Sunni-majority Saudi Arabia. Despite many of these groups' demands being legally recognized, Iran’s ethnic policies are ultimately shaped by the Supreme National Security Council, not elected officials.

If Iran continues to make promises to ethnic groups during elections without follow-through, the long-term damage to ethnic relations and the country's democracy could be severe. Addressing ethnic discontent is essential for maintaining national unity and stability.

Alex Shams, colomonist and writer of Ajam Media Collective, explored the complexities of Iranian and Persian identities, addressing the question, "Are you Iranian or Persian, and what’s the difference?" Initially, Shams viewed "Persian" as a politically and socially convenient term for Iranians, often used to dissociate from the Islamic Republic or to evoke exotic appeal. However, a conversation with an Iranian-American of Azeri-Bakhtiari heritage highlighted the ethnic diversity within Iran, revealing that not all Iranians identify as Persian. While Persians, whose mother tongue is Persian (Farsi), make up about half of Iran's population, the rest includes a mosaic of ethnic and linguistic minorities, such as Azeris, Arabs, Kurds, and Balochs, among others.

Shams critiques the erasure of this diversity, tracing its roots to Persian nationalism fostered under Reza Shah Pahlavi in the 20th century. Reza Shah centralized power by crafting a Persian-centric national identity, banning non-Persian languages, and co-opting Aryanist ideologies, which linked Persian identity to a pseudo-scientific racial hierarchy. This framework marginalized ethnic minorities and ignored the historical diversity of the Persian Empire, which was unified by imperial structures rather than ethnicity.

The Islamic Revolution of 1979 shifted Iranian identity from secular Persian nationalism to Shia religious identity, this is why the terms Shia, Persian, and Iranian in Arab states of the Persian Gulf (where Bahraini Ajams, Kuwaiti Ajams, Qatari, and Emirati Iranian people of Iranian origins live) are often conflated, even by Sunni Achums. While it offered greater inclusion for Shia Muslims regardless of ethnicity, it marginalized religious minorities and secular individuals. Ethnic minorities, such as Azeris and Kurds, gained some linguistic freedoms, but Persian ethnocentrism and Aryanist ideologies persisted, particularly in diaspora communities seeking validation from Western perceptions.

Shams argues that these exclusivist identities undermine Iran's cultural diversity and hinder the possibility of an inclusive, egalitarian society. Instead, he calls for recognition of Iran's multi-ethnic and multicultural heritage as essential to its national identity.

== Nationalist parties of Iran ==
Active parties

- Pan-Iranist Party (founded 1941; banned, operating inside Iran)
- National Front (founded 1949; banned, operating inside Iran)
  - Iran Party (founded 1944; banned, operating inside Iran)
  - Party of the Iranian People (founded 1949; banned, operating inside Iran)
- Nation Party of Iran (founded 1951; banned, operating inside Iran)
- Freedom Movement of Iran (founded 1961; banned, operating inside Iran)
- Marze Por Gohar (founded 1998; banned, exiled)
- Council of Nationalist-Religious Activists of Iran (founded 2000; banned, operating inside Iran)

Historic parties

- Society for the Progress of Iran (1909–1911)
- Revival Party (1920–1927)
- Iran-e-No Party (1927)
- Progress Party (1927–1932)
- Motherland Party (1940–1946)
- Justice Party (1941–1946)
- Azure Party (1942–1953)
- National Will Party (1943–1951)
- Movement of God-Worshipping Socialists (1943–1960)
- Democrat Party of Iran (1946–1984)
- Aria Party (1946–1953)
- Iran Unity Party (1946–1948)
- Society of Muslim Warriors (1948–1955)
- Third Force (1948–1960)
- National Socialist Workers Party of Iran (1952–1953)
- Nationalists’ Party (1957–1963)
- League of Iranian Socialists (1960–1982)
- The Liberation Movement of People of Iran (1964–1988)
- National Democratic Front (1979–1981)
- Iranians' Party (1970–1975)
- Rastakhiz Party (1975–1979)

== See also ==
- Persian nationalism
- Pan-Iranism
- Greater Iran

== Sources ==
- Fisher, William Bayne; Avery, P.; Hambly, G. R. G; Melville, C. (1991). The Cambridge History of Iran. Vol. 7. Cambridge: Cambridge University Press. ISBN 0521200954.
