= Persianization =

Cultural assimilation of Persian traits

Persianization (/ˌpɜːrʒəˌnaɪˈzeɪʃən/) or Persification (/ˌpɜːrsɪfɪˈkeɪʃən/; Persian: پارسی‌سازی، پارسِش), is a sociological process of cultural change in which a non-Persian society becomes "Persianate", meaning it either directly adopts or becomes strongly influenced by the Persian language, culture, literature, art, music, and identity as well as other socio-cultural factors. It is a specific form of cultural assimilation that often includes a language shift. The term applies not only to cultures, but also to individuals, as they acclimate to Persian culture and become "Persianized" or "Persified".

Historically, the term was commonly applied to refer to the cultural shift in non-Iranian peoples living within the Persian cultural sphere, particularly during the early and middle Islamic periods, such as various Caucasian (such as Georgian, Armenian and Dagestani) and Turkic peoples, including the Seljuks, the Ottomans, and the Ghaznavids. The term has also been applied to the adoption of aspects of Persian culture, including language, by non-Persian peoples living in the regions surrounding the Iranian plateau (Persia), such as Anatolia and the Indian subcontinent.

== History ==
=== Pre-Islamic period ===
Unlike the Ancient Greeks and the Roman Empire, the ancient Persian Achaemenid Empire was not concerned with spreading its culture to the many peoples that it conquered. Arguably, the first recorded episode of persianization dates back to Alexander the Great, who, after conquering the Persian Empire in the 4th century BCE, adopted Persian dress, customs and court mannerisms; married a Persian princess, Stateira II and made subjects cast themselves on their faces when approaching him, in Persian-style, known to Greeks as the custom of proskynesis, a symbolic kissing of the hand that Persians paid to their social superiors. Persian dress and practices were also observed by Peucestas, who was later made satrap of Persis, where he conciliated the favour of the Persians to his rule in exchange for those of the Macedonians.

=== Early Islamic period to 15th century ===
After the fall of the Sasanian dynasty in 651, the Umayyad Arabs adopted many of the Persian customs, especially the administrative and the court mannerisms. Arab provincial governors were either persianized Arameans or ethnic Persians; certainly, Persian remained the language of official business of the caliphate until the adoption of Arabic toward the end of the 7th century, when, in 692, minting began at the caliphal capital, Damascus. The new Islamic coins evolved from imitations of Sasanian and Byzantine coins, and the Pahlavi script on the coinage was replaced with Arabic.

The Abbasids, after 750, established their capital in what is now Iraq, eventually at Baghdad. A shift in orientation toward the east is discernible, which was encouraged by increased receptiveness to Persian cultural influence and the roots of the Abbasid revolution in Khorasan, now in Afghanistan A proverb complained about the Persianization of morals by Turks.

=== 16th to 18th centuries ===
Two major powers in West Asia rose, the Persian Safavids and Ottoman Turks. The Safavids reasserted Persian culture and hegemony over South Caucasus, Eastern Anatolia, Mesopotamia and other regions. Many khans, begs and other rulers adopted Persian customs and clothing and patronized Persian culture. They founded the city of Derbent in the North Caucasus (now in Dagestan, Russia). Many ethnic peoples adopted many aspects of Persian culture and contributed to their persianization.

=== Modern era ===
In modern times, the term is often used in connection with non-Persian speakers like the Azeris, Lors and the Kurds.

It has been argued that modern Iranian nationalism was established during the Pahlavi era and was based on the aim of forming a modern nation-state. What is often neglected is that Iranian nationalism has its roots before the Pahlavi, in the early 20th century. On the eve of World War I, Pan-Turkist propaganda focused on the Turkic-speaking lands of Iran, the Caucasus and Central Asia. The ultimate purpose of persuading these populations to secede from the larger political entities to which they belonged and to join the new pan-Turkic homeland. It was the latter appeal to Iranian Azerbaijanis, which contrary to Pan-Turkist intentions, caused a small group of Azerbaijani intellectuals to become the strongest advocates of the territorial integrity of Iran. After the constitutional revolution in Iran, a romantic nationalism was adopted by Azerbaijani Democrats as a reaction to the pan-Turkist irredentist policies emanating from modern Turkey and threatening Iran's territorial integrity. It was during this period that Iranism and linguistic homogenization policies were proposed as a defensive nature against all others. Contrary to what one might expect, foremost among innovating this defensive nationalism were Iranian Azerbaijanis. They viewed that assuring the territorial integrity of the country was the first step in building a society based on law and modern state. Through this framework, their political loyalty outweighed their ethnic and regional affiliations. The adoptions of this integrationist policies paved the way for the emergence of the titular ethnic group's cultural nationalism. Lors are among other Iranian ethnic groups that are subject to ethnic and linguistic assimilation

According to Tadeusz Świętochowski, in 1930s, the term was used to describe the official policy pursued by Reza Shah Pahlavi to assimilate the ethnic minorities in Iran (Iranians as well as Non-Iranians). In particular, within this policy the Azerbaijani language was banned for use on the premises of schools, in theatrical performances, religious ceremonies and in the publication of books. Swietochowski writes:

The steps that the Teheran regime took in the 1930s with the aim of Persianization of the Azeris and other minorities appeared to take a leaf from the writings of the reformist-minded intellectuals in the previous decade. In the quest of imposing national homogeneity on the country where half of the population consisted of ethnic minorities, the Pahlavi regime issued in quick succession bans on the use of Azeri on the premises of schools, in theatrical performances, religious ceremonies, and, finally, in the publication of books. Azeri was reduced to the status of a language that only could be spoken and hardly ever written. As the Persianization campaign gained momentum, it drew inspiration from the revivalist spirit of Zoroastrian national glories. There followed even more invasive official practices, such as changing Turkic-sounding geographic names and interference with giving children names other than Persian ones. While cultivating cordial relations with Kemalist Turkey, Reza Shah carried on a forceful de-Turkification campaign in Iran.

== Mughal Empire ==
The Mughal Empire was an Islamic imperial power that ruled a large portion of the Indian subcontinent and Afghanistan. From 1526, the Mughals invaded Hindustan, from their initial base in Kabul, and they eventually ruled most of the Indian subcontinent by the late 17th and the early 18th centuries, and lasted until the mid-19th century. The Mughal emperors were descendants of the Timurids who had embraced Persian culture, converted to Islam and resided in Turkestan, and they were the ones responsible for the spread of Persian and Islamic culture in Central Asia. At the height of their power around 1700, they controlled most of the Indian Subcontinent and Afghanistan, spreading Persian culture, just as their predecessors the Turkic Ghaznavids and the Turko-Afghan Delhi Sultanate had done. In general, from its earliest days, Persian culture and language was spread in India by various Persianised Central Asian Turkic and Afghan dynasties.

Babur, the founder of the Mughal Empire, identified as Timurid and Chagatai Turkic, and his origin, milieu, training and culture were Persian culture. He was largely responsible for the adoption of the culture by his descendants and for the spread of Persian cultural in the Indian Subcontinent (and Afghanistan), resulting in brilliant literary, artistic and historiographical achievements. Many architectural masterpieces such as the Taj Mahal, Humayun's Tomb and the Badshahi Mosque are in the Persian-Islamic style, with Persian names. Persian was the official language of the Mughal courts.

== By country ==
=== Afghanistan ===
By 1964, the Afghanistan Constitution cited Dari as one of its two official languages alongside Pashto. Although the latter is the designated national language, Dari remains the lingua franca. There are modern initiatives that attempt to "Pashto-ize" all governmental communication. Since Dari is the language of the bureaucracy, Persian-speaking Afghans dominated it. Persianization is especially seen in the case of the "Kabulis", the long-established families from Kabul (usually Pashtuns completely immersed in Persian culture). Persianization is also reinforced by the incidence of urbanization in the country, which influenced the characteristics of the ethnic groups of Afghanistan. The two most significant ethnic groups in Afghanistan are the Pashtuns, who are speakers of the Pashto language, and the Tajiks, who are Persian speakers. While Pashtuns dominated the country since they constitute the majority of the population of Afghanistan, Persian culture still permeated. In the early history of Afghanistan as an independent country, many Pashtuns moved into urbanized areas and adopted Dari as their language. As a result, many ethnic Pashtuns in Afghanistan identify themselves as Tajiks but still have Pashtun names (such as a last name with the suffix "-zai") simply because they speak Dari and are assimilated into Tajiki culture in the country within a process known as "de-tribalization". The Hazara ethnic group speak a dialect of Persian called Hazaragi. Possibly Hazaras used to speak their previous native language that contained more of their native Turkic and Mongolic words within the vocabulary (before Hazaragi). However over the course of centuries, as the native language got extinct (just like some of the other Turkic languages and Mongolic languages that got extinct), the Hazaras adopted Hazaragi, a dialect of the Persian language, hence the result of Persianization. There are many Turkic and Mongolic words still preserved and used in the Hazaragi vocabulary. According to other versions: they are the autochthones of the area, representing a stock of population preceding the invasions by Indo-European speaking people; or they are of mixed race as a result of several waves of migration. In this context, the idea that Hazaras speak Hazaragi, an eastern dialect of Farsi, reflects the historical process of Persianization, while their possible descent from the Hephthalites highlights the deep layers of Central Asian ancestry that shaped their identity. The survival of Turkic and Mongolic elements within Hazaragi can therefore be seen as linguistic evidence of these ancestral connections, although such lexical items make up only about 10–15% of the vocabulary, with the core 85–90% derived from Persian. This linguistic balance reflects the Turkic and Mongolic makeup of the Hazaras, while their possible broader descent from the Hephthalites points to even deeper historical roots.

=== India ===
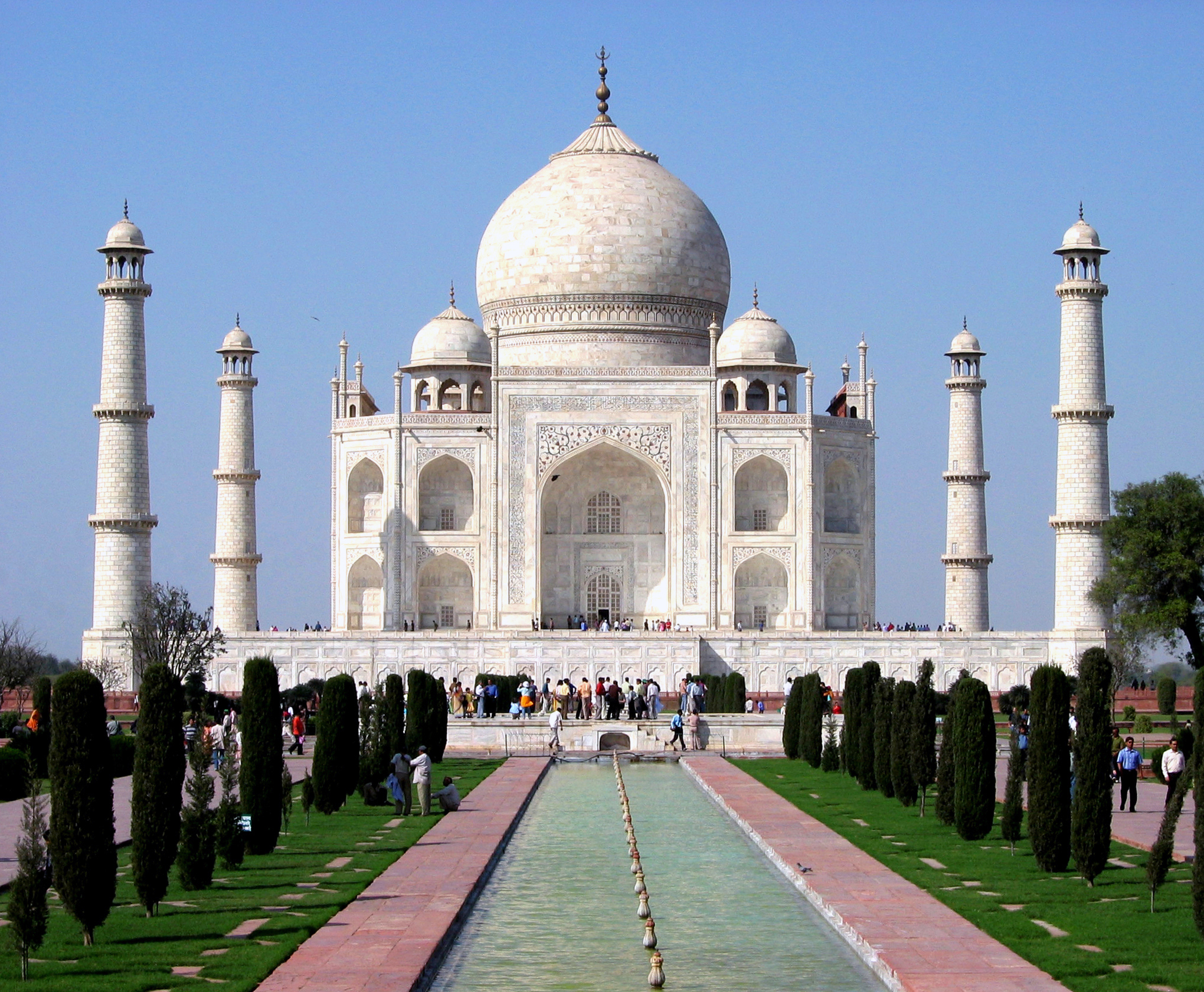
The Mughal era Taj Mahal in Agra, Uttar Pradesh, India, unites Persian and Indian (basically Indo-Islamic) cultural and architectural elements; it is among the most famous examples of Indo-Persian culture as well as a symbol of the greater Indian culture as a whole.

Medieval India during the Delhi Sultanate and Mughal Empire was heavily influenced by the Persian language and culture. The resulting Indo-Persian culture produced poets, such as Amir Khusrau. The influence of Persian on Old Hindi led to the development of the Hindustani language, which further developed into the present-day standardized varieties of Hindi and Urdu. Hindi is one of the 22 official languages of India and the lingua franca of North India. Urdu is an Eighth Schedule language, the status and cultural heritage of which are recognised by the Constitution of India, also having official status in certain Indian states and territories, such as Uttar Pradesh, Bihar, Jharkhand, Delhi, Telangana and West Bengal.

Persianization of Kashmiris began in the 14th century with the establishment of the Kashmir Sultanate. With time, Indic or Sanskrit influences on both the Kashmiri language and culture gradually decreased along with the increase in Persian and Central Asian influence. In modern times, Kashmiris are one of the most Persianate ethnic groups in India.

=== Pakistan ===
Geographically, Pakistan lies at the intersection of the Iranian plateau and Indian subcontinent. Urdu, the national medium of Pakistan, is an Indo-Iranian language that has been historically influenced by Persian. Various languages spoken in Pakistan from the Indo-Aryan language family as well as the Iranian language family have also been influenced by Persian, itself a Western Iranian language. The Pakistani national anthem, Qaumi Taranah, is written almost entirely in Persian. The name "Pakistan", with both Pak (پاک, 'pure') and the place-name suffix of -stan, are drawn directly from the Persian language. These modern linguistic developments are rooted primarily in the rule of various Indo-Islamic dynasties on the Indian subcontinent, most notably the Mughals, who established Persian and later Urdu as official and court languages across the region during the British India era as well as after the partition of India.

The presence of Iranian peoples such as the Pashtuns and the Baloch people in western Pakistan has solidified Persianate culture in the country; this presence was further boosted following the influx of Afghan refugees into Pakistan as a consequence of the Afghanistan conflict.

=== Tajikistan ===
In March 2007, the Tajik President, Emomali Rahmon changed his surname from Rakhmonov to Rahmon, getting rid of the Russian "-ov" ending. and removed his patronymic of Sharipovich out of respect for Tajik culture. Following the move, a large number governments officials and civil servants Tajikified their own names. In April 2016, this practice became officially mandated by law for newborn Tajik children, with children from minority and mixed families retaining the right to their traditional surnames.

== See also ==
- Turco-Persian tradition
- Iranian peoples
  - Persians
- Pan-Iranism
