= Zia ol Din Tabatabaee =

14th Prime Minister of Iran

Seyyed Zia'eddin Tabataba'i
- ضیاءالدین طباطبایی
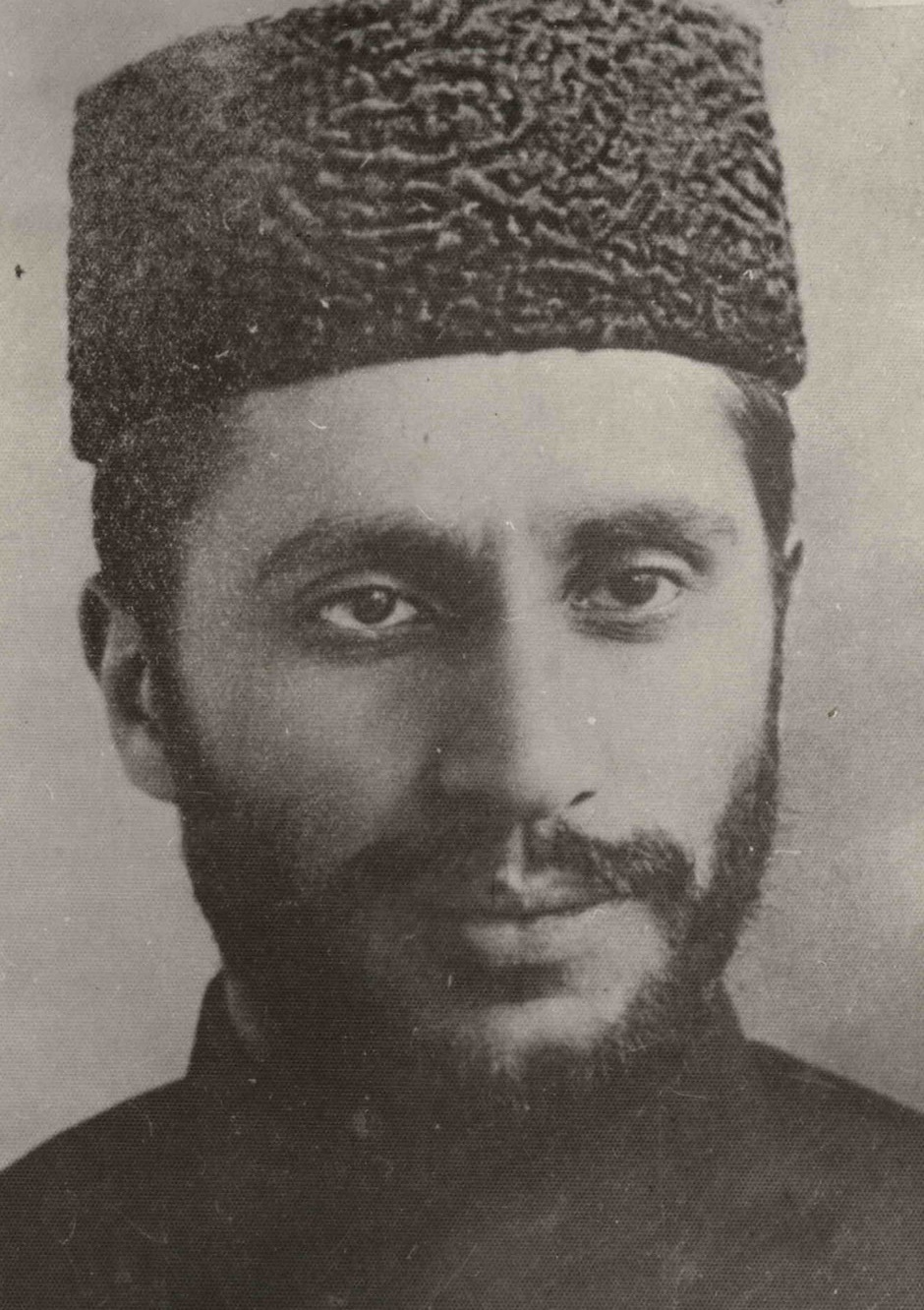
- Tabataba'i in 1921

14th Prime Minister of Iran
- In office 21 February 1921 – 4 June 1921
- Monarch: Ahmad Shah Qajar
- Preceded by: Fathollah Khan Akbar
- Succeeded by: Ahmad Qavam

Member of Parliament of Iran
- In office 7 March 1944 – 12 March 1946
- Constituency: Yazd

Personal details
- Born: June 1889 Shiraz, Sublime State of Persia
- Died: 29 August 1969 (aged 80) Tehran, Imperial State of Iran
- Resting place: Shah Abdol-Azim Shrine
- Party: Homeland Party

Seyyed Zia al-Din Tabataba'i Yazdi (Persian: سید ضیاءالدین طباطبایی یزدی; June 1889 – 29 August 1969) was an Iranian journalist and pro-Constitution politician who, with the help of Reza Shah, spearheaded the 1921 Persian coup d'état and aimed to reform Qajar rule, which was in domestic turmoil and under foreign intervention. He subsequently became the 13th Prime Minister of Persia (Iran).

== Early life ==
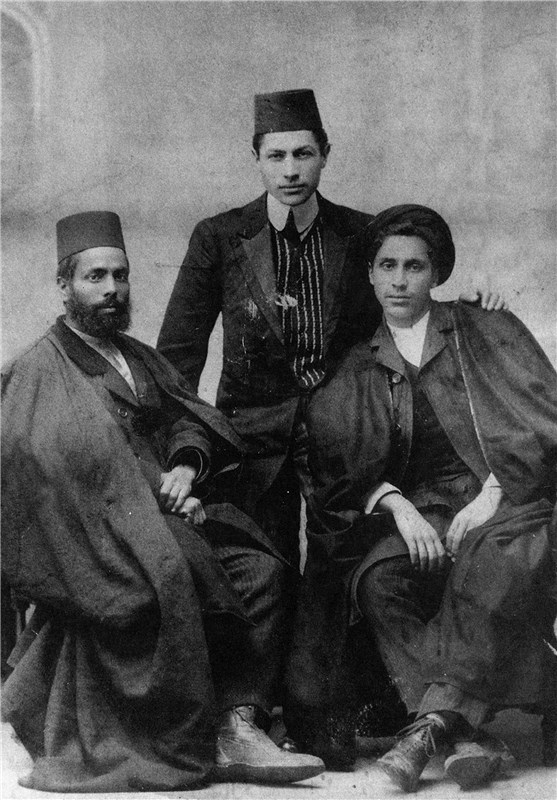
Young Zia (right)

Zia was born in the city of Shiraz in June 1889. He was one of four children. His father took the family to Tabriz when Zia was two years old. He spent most of his early years in Tabriz, where his father, Seyyed Ali Tabataba'i Yazdi was an influential cleric. When Zia was twelve he went to Tehran, and at fifteen, he moved back to Shiraz in the company of his grandmother, who was said to be a woman of unusual erudition and independence.

By the age of sixteen he started his first newspaper called Nedaye Islam "Voice of Islam", followed by the newspaper Ra'ad (Thunder) at the age of twenty-three. After Ra'ad was shut down by the authorities, he started two other newspapers called Shargh (East), followed by Bargh (Lightning), and became active in the Persian Constitutional Revolution. Zia's newspapers usually consisted of blistering attacks on prominent politicians of the Qajar monarchy, which caused them to be closed several times. The first time, the ostensible reason given for the closure was that he was only nineteen and the law required an editor to be at least thirty. After the last two closures, he left for Europe and spent fourteen months primarily in France. By the time he returned, Iran was, in spite of declared neutrality, occupied by Russian, British, and Ottoman forces. Zia decided to resume his journalism, this time focusing on his famous newspaper Ra'ad (Thunder), and came out in strong support of the British in the war. One of his colleagues for the newspaper was Habibollah Ayn-al Molk, the father of Amir-Abbas Hoveyda, who later became Iran's Prime Minister.

In 1917, Zia was commissioned by the government to make a trip to St. Petersburg, where he witnessed firsthand the Bolshevik Revolution. It is even claimed that Zia was present when Lenin made his famous speech about "seizing power" in the name of the proletariat. This affected his perception of politics, and made him a persistent advocate of the policy of rapprochement with the big northern neighbor. In 1919, the Iranian government, headed at the time by Vossug ed Dowleh, sent Zia back to Russia, this time to negotiate an agreement of friendship and alliance with the newly formed, ultimately short-lived Azerbaijan Democratic Republic.

== Rise to power and subsequent events ==
=== 1921 coup ===
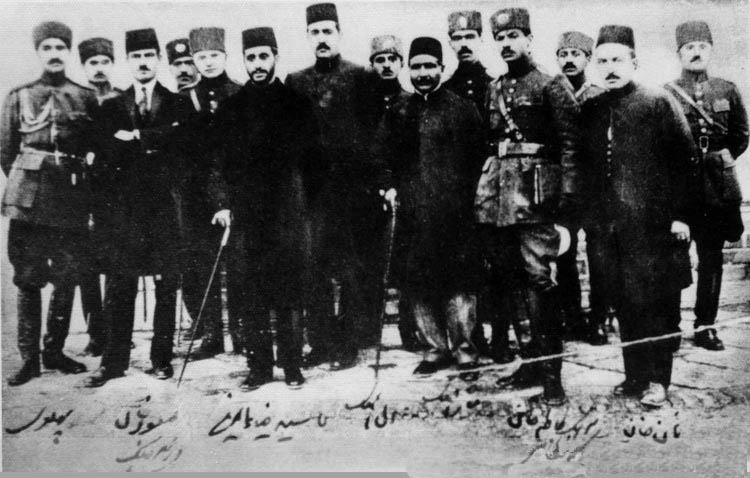
Coup d'état of 1921. Zia (center left), Reza Khan (far left)

Zia came to power in the 1921 Persian coup d'état of 22 February 1921 (3 Esfand 1299) with the help of Reza Khan Mirpanj, who later became the Shah of Persia.

Zia gave a fierce speech in parliament against the corrupt political class that tenaciously defended its privileges from the pre-parliamentary period which had brought Persia to the brink of ruin. Ahmad Shah Qajar appointed the thirty-three year old as the Prime Minister of Persia.

Within hours of taking power, the new government immediately declared a new order, which included, "all the residents of the city of Tehran must keep quiet. . . . The state of siege is established . . . all newspapers and prints will be stopped . . . public meetings in the houses and in different places are stopped . . . all shops where wines and spirits are sold, as well as theaters, cinemas and clubs, where gambling goes on, must be closed." Zia and Reza Khan, arrested some four hundred rich people and aristocrats who had inherited wealth and power over the span of ten to twenty years while the country experienced poverty, corruption, famine, instability and chaos. Their cabinets changed every six or seven months and could hardly manage the country's daily affairs. According to Zia, these "few hundred nobles, who hold the reins of power by inheritance, sucked, leech-like, the blood of the people".

Zia formed his first cabinet on 24 February. The ministers were:

- Acting Minister of Justice: Mirza Mostafa Khan Mansur os-Saltaneh
- Minister of Foreign Affairs: Mirza Mahmoud Khan Modir ol-Molk
- Acting Minister of Interior: Mirza Hossein Khan Adl ol-Molk
- Minister of Finance: Mirza Issa Khan Feyz
- Minister of War: Major Masoud Khan (Keyhan)
- Minister of Education, Endowments and Fine Arts: Ja'far-Qoli Khan Nayyer ol-Molk (Hedayat)
- Minister of Public Works and Commerce: Mirza Mahmoud Khan Mowgher od-Dowleh (Mowgher)
- Minister of Post and Telegraph: Taghi Khan Moshir-e-Azam
- Minister of Health and Welfare: Dr. Ali-Asghar Khan Moaddab od-Dowleh (Nafisi)

Due to the death of Mowgher od-Dowleh and the resignation of Masoud Khan and Issa Khan Feyz, Zia carried out a cabinet reshuffle on 27 April, in which he assumed the post of interior minister himself:

- Acting Minister of Justice: Mirza Mostafa Khan Mansur os-Saltaneh
- Minister of Foreign Affairs: Mohammad-Taghi Moazzaz od-Dowleh
- Minister of Interior: Seyyed Zia od-Din Tabatabaei
- Minister of Finance: Mirza Mahmoud Khan Modir ol-Molk
- Minister of War: Reza Khan Sardar-e-Sepah
- Minister of Education, Endowments and Fine Arts: Jafar-Qoli Khan Nir ol-Molk
- Acting Minister of Public Works and Commerce: Mirza Mahmoud Khan Modir ol-Molk
- Minister of Post and Telegraph: Taghi Khan Moshir-e-Azam
- Minister of Health and Welfare: Dr. Ali-Asghar Khan Moaddab od-Dowleh
- Minister of State: Major Masoud Khan

=== Policies ===
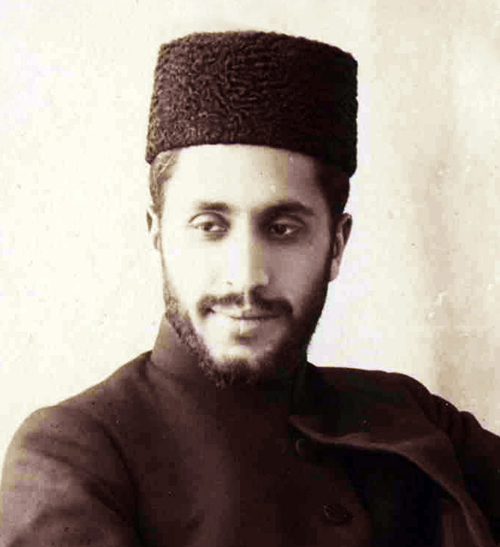
Zia Tabataba'i, circa 1921

Zia declared that his cabinet's program included far-reaching measures such as the "formation of an army...eventual abolition of the capitulations...establishment of friendly ties with the Soviet Union." At the same time, he tried to implement a truly impressive number of changes in the capital itself—from ordering new rules of hygiene for stores that handled foodstuffs to bringing street lights to the city's notoriously dark roads. He talked of land reform, making him one of the early champions of the idea in modern Iran. He talked of making education available to every Iranian. His political reform program envisaged that the entire legal system of Iran should be modernized and aligned with European standards. He set up a reform commission headed by Iranian intellectual, Mohammad Ali Foroughi. The Ministry of Finance was initially closed in order to fundamentally reform the tax and finance system, which had essentially collapsed.

However, the necessary funds were simply not available to stimulate the economy or to invest in infrastructure. The abolition of the rights of surrender for the British and Russians also made no headway. Moreover, some of his decisions such as ordering a ban on alcohol, bars, and casinos, as well as, closing shops on Fridays and on religious holidays, angered merchants. It was also not long before the families of those arrested organized a political campaign against Zia, calling his administration "the black cabinet", which resulted in constant unrest. Zia informed the families that the arrested would be released if they paid four million toman in arrears in taxes, to which the families refused.

=== Downfall ===
There was nothing short of hubris in Zia's behavior. With every passing day, the rank of his enemies swelled and his days in office seemed numbered. Foremost among his enemies was the shah himself, Ahmad Shah Qajar, who no longer wanted to support Zia's radical reform program. But above all he wanted the release of the arrested nobles. Zia's last meeting with Ahmad Shah took place only hours before his dismissal and days before his exile. He had always been defiantly oblivious to the court's solemnities and the rules of etiquette for a royal audience. He was even known to have spent one whole meeting sitting on a windowsill, as the shah had refused to put chairs in the room. That day, he walked into the shah's office, a cigarette dangling from the corner of his mouth, and continued to walk around as he talked. Ahmad Shah was incensed and practically threw Zia out of the office; hours later he arranged for his dismissal.

After consulting Ahmad Shah, Reza Khan asked Zia on 23 May 1921, to resign and leave the country. Reza Khan offered him any sum he deemed necessary from the treasury. Zia took twenty-five thousand toman to cover his travel expenses—by no measure a large sum—and left the country. All political prisoners were released on 24 May. Although the reign of Seyyed Zia lasted only 93 days, this short period marked the beginning of an important period in the contemporary history of Iran, the rise of the Pahlavi dynasty.

Despite his opponents being mainly Qajar supporters and aristocrats, Zia had the support of many Iranians including intellectuals such as Aref Qazvini and Mirzadeh Eshghi. Aref was so fascinated by Zia that after he left Iran, he composed a famous poem in praise of him: (...ای دست حق پشت و پناهت بازآ / چشم آرزومند نگاهت بازآ / وی توده ی ملت سپاهت بازآ / قربان کابینه سیاهت بازآ). A few years later Mirzadeh Eshghi in his ode of the fourth parliament wrote: "It is not enough as much we admire Zia, we won't afford it....I say something but he was something else....".

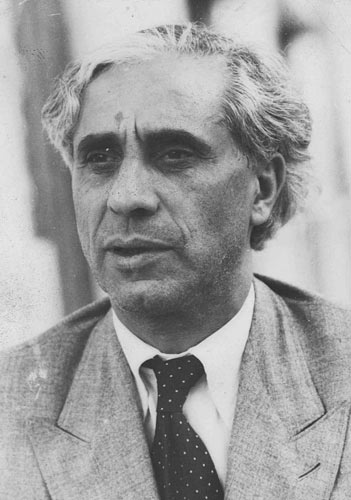
Older Tabataba'i

=== Exile ===
Zia spent the next few years traveling throughout Europe. For a while he sold Persian carpets in Berlin; then he moved to Geneva, where he tried, unsuccessfully, to write a book with the help of his friend Mohammad-Ali Jamalzadeh, the famous exiled Iranian writer. He then settled in Montreux, where he continued his carpet business. After about seventeen years of nomadic life in Europe, he went to Palestine and spent the next six years there. In December 1931, he was elected Secretary General of the World Islamic Congress in Jerusalem. In this role, he developed plans to establish an Islamic University (the Al-Aqsa University). Accordingly, the university would have three faculties, one for theology and Islamic law, one for medicine and pharmacy, and one for engineering. In order to make this work, Zia traveled with Amin al-Husseini to Iraq and India to collect donations. However, they were unsuccessful in attaining enough funds, and therefore were not able to establish the university. Zia then settled on becoming a farmer in Palestine. He developed a special affinity for alfalfa and became notorious for his belief that it was the panacea for everything. He even developed a veritable alfalfa cookbook. Among his contributions to Iranian agriculture was the introduction of strawberries to the country.

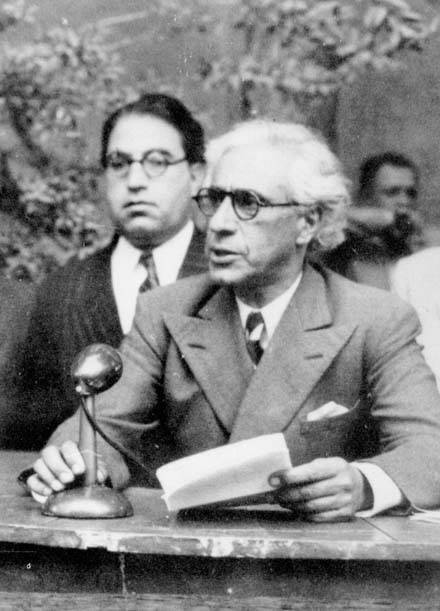
Zia Tabataba'i

=== Return to Iran ===
His life of exile ended in 1943 when he was encouraged to return to Iran. In Iran, Zia was elected as the governor of Yazd. Subsequently, Zia attained a central position on the political stage. Everyone was either for or against him. During the last fifteen years of his life, Zia became an advisor and conduit to the shah, who was hesitant at first, but preferred him over Ahmad Qavam, with whom he had a fall out with. Zia would meet regularly with Mohammad Reza Pahlavi, and by all accounts talked to him frankly and honestly. On the afternoon of 10 April 1965 (21 Farvardin 1344), when the shah was the subject of an assassination attempt, Zia went to the court and insisted on taking the shah on a tour of the city. Everywhere they went people showed their enthusiastic support for the monarch. The excursion, according to Zia, did much to improve the mood of the understandably shattered shah. Zia also claimed to have told the shah that "a king can't fly around his capital in a helicopter, but must mingle with the masses".

== Personality ==
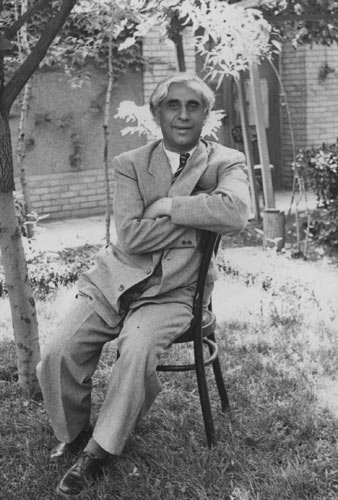
Seyyed Zia in Tehran, c. 1950

The famous "Leading Personalities" files of the British Foreign Office described Zia as:

"a man of outstanding singles of purpose and courage. Personally attractive, religious without being fanatical or obscurantist...appointed prime minister with full powers by Ahmad Shah on the 1st of March 1921 and affected numerous arrests. His reforms were too radical for the country and the time, and he fell from power in June....It is no exaggeration to say that [in the postwar years, he] rallied the Anti-Tudeh forces in Persian and thus made it possible to resist intensive Soviet Pressure when it came. Alone among Persians he has never allowed personal or even party interest to interfere with his policy. By his uncompromising resistance to Russian encroachments he became the symbol of Persia's will to resist....He is both honest and energetic -- a very rare combination in Persia....The comparative lack of success of his party was due [among other things to his inability to] reconcil[e] his progressive ideas with the conservation of many of his followers. Has something of a mystic in him."

Zia's political tendencies were perceived to be pro-British by many Iranians. However, unlike many Iranian politicians who had covert foreign relations, Zia was quite open and never denied being "a friend of the British". In fact, the British at the time were already very much entangled in Iranian affairs. The Qajars were constantly seeking help and advice from the British. Reza Khan too, along with many high ranking politicians, were immensely pro-British, at least initially. Part of the intention behind this was to protect Iran against the Russian expansionist policies of that time. Zia insisted that friendship was different from servitude. He argued that fear was the sole motive for this politically costly decision to become a friend of the British. "I was a friend of the British," he declared, "because being their friend, you only pay a price...but being their enemy guarantees your destruction. All my life I have paid the price for this friendship, but as a rational man, I was never ready to be destroyed".

== Death ==
Zia died on 29 August 1969 at the age of 80 of a heart attack in Tehran. He was buried at the Shah Abdol-Azim Shrine in Ray.

Sometime after his death, the ownership of Zia's house was transferred to SAVAK (Iranian Intelligence) and was then converted into what is today known as Evin Prison, the main prison where political prisoners are kept, both before the Iranian Revolution and afterwards.

Political offices
Preceded by Fathollah Khan Akbar	Prime Minister of Iran; 1921	Succeeded by Ahmad Qavam
Party political offices
Vacant Party founded	Leader of the National Will Party; 1943–1946	Vacant Party dissolved
