= Motherland Party (Iran) =

- Leader: Karim Sanjabi
- Dissolved: 1946
- Merger of: Battle Party, Patriots' Party and Independence Party
- Merged into: Iran Party
- Newspaper: Iran-e Ma
- Ideology: Iranian nationalism

Motherland Party, National Party or Patriotic Party (Persian: حزب میهن, romanized: Ḥezb-e Mihan) was a party in Iran during 1940s. It was a small organization of intellectuals and a triumvirate of three parties called Peykār (transl. Battle) Esteqlāl (transl. Independence) and Mihanparastān (transl. Patriots).

The party enjoyed influence in western parts of Iran due to its leader, Karim Sanjabi, who came from a Kurdish tribal nobility background.

The central leadership of the Motherland Party voted to merge it with the Iran Party because of the common objectives and the approach of resistance adopted by both parties. As a result, the latter succeeded the branches and offices of the party in various cities. They later became part of the National Front.
