= Iran Party =

Iran Party حزب ایران
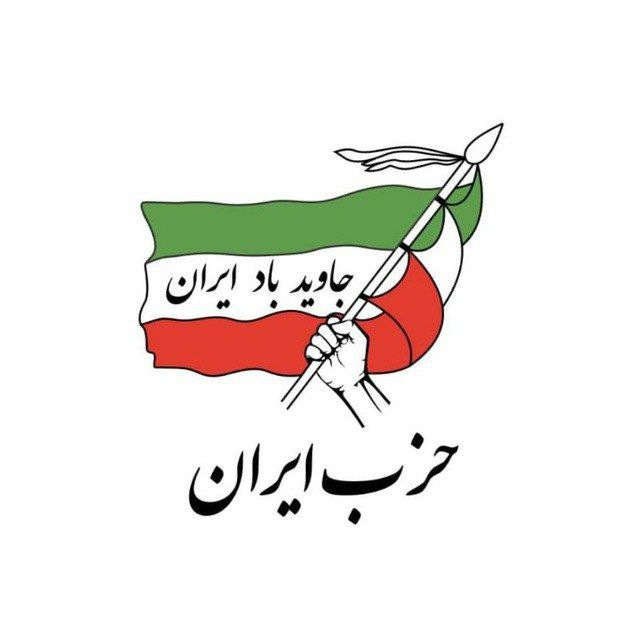
- Secretary-General: Bagher Ghadiri-Asl
- Founded: October 1941; 84 years ago as the Engineers’ Association; May 1944; 82 years ago
- Merger of: Motherland Party
- Headquarters: Tehran
- Ideology: Mosaddeghism; Liberal socialism; Civic nationalism; Secularism (Iranian)
- Political position: Centre-left
- National affiliation: National Front (Since 1949); United Front of Progressive Parties (1946–1947)
- Slogan: Persian: برای ایران، بافکر ايرانی، بدست ايرانی "For Iran, With Iranian Thought, by Iranian Hands"; Persian: کار، داد، آزادی "Work, Justice, Freedom"

Party flag

Website
- Doesn't exist/Used to exist

The Iran Party (Persian: حزب ایران, romanized: Ḥezb-e Irān) is a socialist and nationalist party in Iran. Founded in 1941, it is described as the "backbone of the National Front", the leading umbrella organization of Iranian nationalists established in 1949. The party's total membership has never exceeded the several hundred figure.

== History ==
The Iran Party's core members derived from the Iranian Engineers’ Association (Persian: کانون مهندسین ایران, romanized: Kānun-e mohandesin-e Irān). In the 1944 Iranian legislative election, five of the party's leaders, including Rezazadeh Shafaq, Ghulam'Ali Farivar, AhdulHamid Zanganeh, Hussein Mu'aven, and Abdallah Mu'azemi, won seats, as well as Mohammad Mossadegh (who was not a member but whom the party effectively supported).

From June 1946 to January 1947, it was allied with the communist Tudeh Party and some other left-wing parties under the name United Front of Progressive Parties. Following the alliance, some members left the party in protest and established the Iran Unity Party. The party was part of the short-lived coalition government of Ahmad Qavam in 1946.

In January 1947, the party expressed support for the Eisenhower Doctrine in a statement.

The party helped Mossadegh establish the National Front, nationalize the oil industry and rise to power. Some members held office during Mosaddegh government. It was suppressed following the British–American-backed coup d'état in 1953 and was outlawed in 1957, on the grounds that it had an alliance with the Tudeh Party of Iran ten years earlier. It was revived in 1960 and actively contributed to the National Front (II), which was disintegrated in 1963 and forced to survive secretly. Iran Party held a congress in 1964. Not much is known about the activities of the party between 1964 and the mid-1970s except of some irregular meetings and exchanging of views. In 1977, alongside League of Socialists and Nation Party, it revived the National Front (IV) and demanded Ruhollah Khomeini's return to Iran. In early 1979, then-secretary-general of the party Shapour Bakhtiar was appointed as the last prime minister by the Shah and included two Iran Party members in his cabinet. The party, however, denounced his acceptance of the post, expelled him and called him a "traitor". The party did not play an important role in Iranian political arena after 1979 and was soon declared banned.

=== Secretaries-general ===
Name	Tenure	Ref
Allahyar Saleh	1944–Unknown	
Abolfazl Qassemi	Unknown	
Asghar Gitibin	Unknown	
Karim Sanjabi	Unknown	
Shapour Bakhtiar	1978–1979	
Abolfazl Qassemi	1979–1993	
Nezameddin Movahed	1999–2007	
Aligholi Bayani	2007–2009	
Sayed Hassan Amin	2009–2019	
Bagher Ghadiri-Asl	Current	

== Ideology ==
Founded by mostly European-educated technocrats, it advocated "a diluted form of French socialism" (i.e., it "modeled itself on" the moderate Socialist Party of France) and promoted social democracy and liberal nationalism. The socialist tent of the party was more akin to that of the Fabian Society than to the scientific socialism of Karl Marx. Its focus on liberal socialism and democratic socialism principles made it quite different from pure left-wing parties, and it did not show much involvement in labour rights discussions. The party is secular and believes Islam is "sacred a religion to mix with the bread-and-butter issues of daily politics."

== See also ==
Splinter groups

- Movement of God-Worshipping Socialists (1943)
- Iran Unity Party (1946)
- Party of the Iranian People (1949)
