= Democrat Party of Iran =

- Leader: Ahmad Qavam
- General Secretary: Ahmad Aramesh
- Youth wing chairman: Hassan Arsanjani
- Founded: June 29, 1946
- Dissolved: 1948
- Workers wing: Central Syndicate of Iranian Craftsmen, Farmers, and Workers
- Ideology: Nationalism; Reformism

Iranian Democrat Party or Democrat Party of Iran (DPI; Persian: حزب دموکرات ایران, romanized: Ḥezb-e Demowkrāt-e Irān) was a short-lived political party in Iran, founded in 1946 and led by Ahmad Qavam. It was the most important party formed by the old Qajar nobility, and an association of aristocrats and anti-British radical intellectuals. With the fall of Qavam, it disintegrated in 1948.

The organization tried to give itself the appearance of being the heir of the old Democrat party and was ironically named "Democrat Party of Iran" in contrast to the communist "Democrat Party of Azerbaijan".

The party's ideology was to be nationalist and reformist, but it was organizationally fragile as it was ideologically amorphous. It called for extensive economic, social, and administrative reforms while advocating a revision of the Iranian Armed Forces. It developed an authoritarianist structure and some suspect it planned to create a one-party state.

According to Ervand Abrahamian, Qavam had two paradoxical reasons to establish the party, a "double-edged sword directed at the left as well as the right". He intended to defeat royalist and pro-British candidates in the 1947 Iranian legislative election and to use it to "mobilize non-communist reformers, steal the thunder from the left, and hence build a counterbalance to the Tudeh Party".
