= Shapour Bakhtiar =

Iranian politician (1914–1991)

- شاپور بختیار
- Bakhtiar c. 1979

40th Prime Minister of Iran
- In office 6 January 1979 – 11 February 1979 (Note: The office was disputed between him and Mehdi Bazargan from 4 to 11 February 1979.)
- Monarch: Mohammad Reza Pahlavi
- Preceded by: Gholam Reza Azhari
- Succeeded by: Mehdi Bazargan (Acting)

Minister of Interior
- In office 16 January 1979 – 11 February 1979
- Prime Minister: Himself
- Preceded by: Abbas Gharabaghi
- Succeeded by: Ahmad Sayyed Javadi

Member of Regency Council
- In office 13 January 1979 – 22 January 1979
- Appointed by: Mohammad Reza Pahlavi

Deputy Minister of Labor
- In office 1 July 1952 – 9 April 1953
- Monarch: Mohammad Reza Pahlavi
- Prime Minister: Mohammad Mosaddegh

Personal details
- Born: 26 June 1914 Dehkord, Qajar Iran
- Died: 6 August 1991 (aged 77) Suresnes, France
- Cause of death: Assassination (stab wounds)
- Resting place: Montparnasse Cemetery, Paris, France
- Party: National Resistance Movement of Iran; (1979–1991); Iran Party (1949–1979)
- Other political affiliations: National Front (1949–1978)
- Spouse(s): Madeleine; Shahintaj
- Children: 4
- Education: Faculty of Law of Paris

Military service
- Allegiance: (Second Spanish Republic) Spanish Republic; France (Free France) French Resistance
- Branch/service: International Brigades; French Army
- Years of service: 1936–1938; 1940–1945
- Unit: 30th Artillerie Regiment
- Battles/wars: Spanish Civil War; World War II

Shapour Bakhtiar (Persian: شاپور بختیار,; 26 June 1914 – 6 August 1991) was an Iranian politician who served as the last Prime Minister of Iran under the rule of Mohammad Reza Pahlavi. Bakhtiar stated that he favored neither a republican nor a monarchical system, advocating instead for what he called a "progressive democracy".

After the Iranian Revolution, he went into exile in France, where he founded the National Resistance Movement of Iran in 1980. He sought support from the Iraqi president, Saddam Hussein, for his efforts to overthrow the Khomeini government, and according to contemporary reports he was to have played a key role in Iraq's plans at the start of the Iran–Iraq War.

In 1991, he and his secretary were murdered in his home in Suresnes, France, by agents of the Islamic Republic of Iran.

== Early life ==
Bakhtiar was born on 26 June 1914 in Dehkord, now known as Shahr-e Kord, (southwestern Iran) into a family of Iranian tribal nobility, the family of the paramount chieftains of the then powerful Bakhtiari tribe. His father, Mohammad Reza Khan (Sardar-e-Fateh), and his mother, Naz-Baygom, were both Lurs and Bakhtiaris. Bakhtiar's maternal grandfather, Najaf-Gholi Khan Samsam ol-Saltaneh, had been appointed prime minister twice, in 1912 and 1918.

Bakhtiar's mother died when he was seven years old. His father was executed by Reza Shah in 1934 while Shapour was studying in Paris as a part of Reza Shah's crackdown on Bakhtiari tribe leaders.

== Education ==
He attended elementary school in Shahr-e Kord and then secondary school, first in Isfahan and later in Beirut, where he received his high school diploma from a French school. He attended Beirut University for two years. He and his cousin, Teymur Bakhtiar, then went to Paris for additional university education at the Faculty of Law. There, he attended the College of Political Science.

Being a firm opponent of totalitarian rule, he was active in the Spanish Civil War for the Second Spanish Republic against General Francisco Franco's fascist Nationalists. In 1940, he volunteered for the French Army – rather than the French Foreign Legion – and fought in the 30th Artillerie Regiment of Orléans. Bakhtiar did 18 months' military service. While living in Saint-Nicolas-du-Pélem, he fought with the French Resistance against the German occupation. He studied law at the Sorbonne, and he returned to Iran in 1946.

== Political career ==
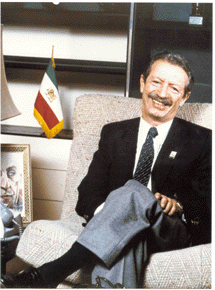
Bakhtiar in 1978

Bakhtiar joined the social democratic Iran Party in 1949 and led its youth organization. He worked for the Ministry of Labor, where he supported independent trade unions. During the premiership of Mohammad Mosaddegh, he served as deputy minister of labor. After the Shah was restored to power by the British-American sponsored coup d'état, Bakhtiar set up a private law practice, and he remained a critic of the Shah's rule.

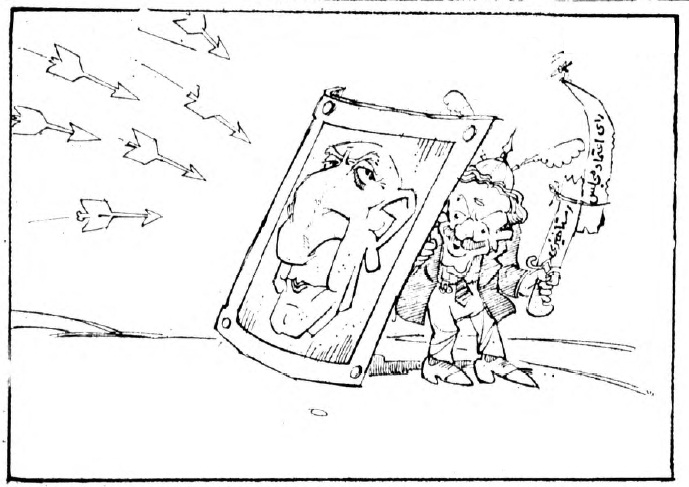
Shapour Bakhtiar and Mosaddegh cartoon in Ettelaat newspaper, 22 January 1978

In the years after the coup, Bakhtiar was repeatedly jailed for his opposition activities, for a total of about six years. He rose to become deputy leader of the reorganized National Front. In June 1977, he signed an open letter to the Shah demanding respect for the constitution and for human rights.

At the end of 1978, as the Shah's power was crumbling, the Shah asked Bakhtiar to form a civilian government. In January 1979, he was appointed prime minister, as a concession to the Shah's opponents, especially the followers of Ayatollah Ruhollah Khomeini. He accepted the post only on the condition that the Shah leave the country. The appointment led to his expulsion from the National Front. He later said that he had accepted because he feared a revolution in which communists and mullahs would take over the country, which he thought would ruin Iran.

During his 37 days as prime minister, Bakhtiar lifted press restrictions, freed the remaining political prisoners, and promised to dissolve SAVAK, lift martial law and hold free elections. He also withdrew Iran from CENTO, canceled $7 billion in arms orders from the United States, and stopped oil sales to South Africa and Israel. Khomeini and the main opposition rejected these measures, and Khomeini declared Bakhtiar's government illegal.

Bakhtiar failed to persuade Khomeini to delay his return to Iran, and the closure of Mehrabad Airport proved only a temporary measure. Khomeini arrived in Tehran on 1 February 1979, and on 5 February he named Mehdi Bazargan prime minister of a provisional government. On 9 February, air force technicians mutinied at the Doshan Tappeh base, and on 11 February the senior military commanders declared the armed forces neutral, in effect withdrawing their support from Bakhtiar's government. By the afternoon of 12 February, Bakhtiar had gone into hiding. He later reached France.

== Exile ==
Shortly after the revolution, Ayatollah Sadegh Khalkhali, a religious judge and later chairman of the Revolutionary Court, announced to the press that the death sentence had been passed on members of the Pahlavi family and former Shah officials, including Bakhtiar.

In July 1979, Bakhtiar emerged in Paris. He was given political asylum there. In August 1980, he founded the National Resistance Movement of Iran in Paris. The movement was regarded as the best organized and best financed of the exile groups, and from June 1980 it operated a radio station, Radio Iran, with transmitters in Cairo and Baghdad. Bakhtiar called for a pluralistic political system, and he made nationalism, democracy and social justice conditions for membership in the movement. On the night of 9–10 July 1980, several hundred active-duty and retired paratroopers attempted to launch a coup from the Nojeh air base, in what became known as the Nojeh coup plot. Bakhtiar was accused of helping to organize the plot, which prompted the Islamic Republic to issue a death sentence on him.

=== Relations with Iraq ===
Bakhtiar sought the support of the Iraqi government of Saddam Hussein for his efforts to overthrow the Islamic Republic. According to a Central Intelligence Agency report of 13 February 1980, he had traveled secretly from Paris to Baghdad to consult Saddam, and he expected major political and military support from the Iraqi government. The same report said that Bakhtiar was paying a Kurdish leader about $300,000 a month to support 2,500 armed men, in coordination with Barzan Ibrahim al-Tikriti, Saddam's half-brother and head of Iraqi intelligence.

According to a CIA report of 18 April 1980, Bakhtiar visited Baghdad again on 12–13 April 1980 at Saddam's request, and he had a two-hour meeting alone with Saddam. Saddam said that he was willing to support Bakhtiar, but he could not persuade Bakhtiar to cooperate with General Gholam Ali Oveissi, who was also receiving Iraqi aid and who favored overthrowing the Khomeini government by military means. Bakhtiar was reluctant to support Oveissi because of his past associations, and he warned Saddam against committing Iraqi soldiers in support of Oveissi. The report said that Bakhtiar was conducting a propaganda campaign through two radio stations under his control, and that he had a fairly large quantity of arms in the Basra area. At the end of April 1980, The Christian Science Monitor reported that Bakhtiar was trying to rally Western and Muslim support for a counter-revolution, and that he had tried to build a close political and military network with Oveissi.

According to The Christian Science Monitor, citing Iraqi and Arab sources, Bakhtiar was to have played a key role in Iraq's original plan for the Iran–Iraq War, which began in September 1980. He reportedly assured the Iraqis that the Bakhtiari tribes around Kermanshah would be among the first to join an uprising, and Bakhtiari opponents of the Iranian government had reportedly received military training in Oman, Egypt and Iraq. The journalist Eric Rouleau wrote in 1981 that, according to a secret report, Iraq had planned to install a "free government" led by Bakhtiar in Ahvaz on 5 October 1980, after capturing Khuzestan. When the Iraqi offensive failed to achieve its aims, relations between Bakhtiar and Iraq deteriorated. According to The Christian Science Monitor, he was summoned to Baghdad on 2 October 1980, but he got only as far as Ramadi before turning back to Jordan after a dispute with his hosts. In a 1982 interview, he blamed Khomeini for starting the war by interfering in Iraq's internal affairs, and he said that an understanding with Iraq would be possible if someone other than Khomeini led Iran.

=== Assassination attempts ===
On 18 July 1980, he escaped an assassination attempt by a group of three attackers in his home in Neuilly-sur-Seine, a suburb of Paris, in which a policeman and a neighbor were killed. The five-man assassination team with ties to the newly formed Islamic republic, led by Anis Naccache, a Lebanese revolutionary, was captured. They were given life sentences, but French President François Mitterrand pardoned them in July 1990. They were sent to Tehran. In 1989, according to the Abdorrahman Boroumand Center, the Iranian Ministry of Intelligence under Ali Fallahian planned a second attempt to kill Bakhtiar, using poison, through a member of his movement, but the attempt did not succeed.

== Death ==
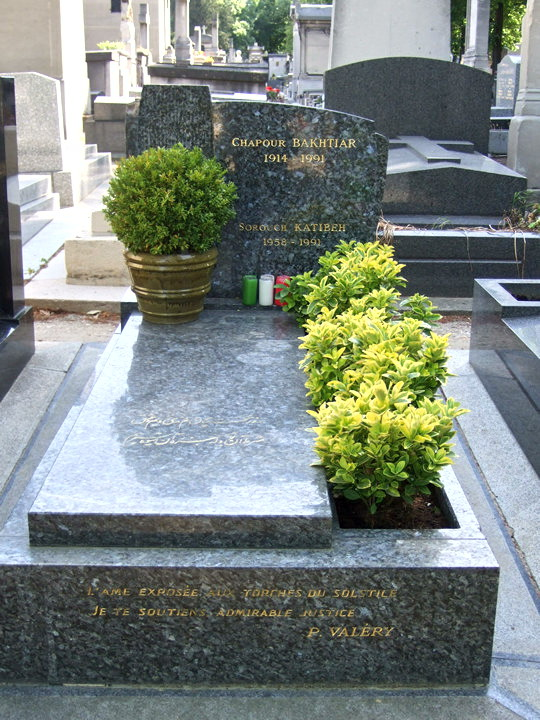
Tomb of Shapour Bakhtiar in Montparnasse Cemetery, Paris, France

On 6 August 1991, Bakhtiar was murdered along with his secretary, Soroush Katibeh, by three assassins in his home in the Parisian suburb of Suresnes. Both men were killed with kitchen knives. Their bodies were not found until at least 36 hours after death, even though Bakhtiar had heavy police protection. The killers had been brought to the house through Fereydoun Boyerahmadi, a member of Bakhtiar's movement who had been recruited by Iranian intelligence. They had entered as visitors, and had been searched and left identity documents with a guard before entering.

Bakhtiar was buried in Montparnasse Cemetery in Paris.

=== Trial ===
Two of the assassins escaped to Iran. A third, Ali Vakili Rad, was apprehended in Switzerland, along with an alleged accomplice, Zeynalabedin Sarhadi, a great-nephew of Hashemi Rafsanjani, the president of Iran at the time. Both were extradited to France for trial. A report by the French prosecutors concluded that Iranian intelligence services had taken part in the conspiracy. Vakili Rad was sentenced to life in prison in December 1994, but Sarhadi was acquitted. Another defendant, Massoud Hendi, was sentenced to ten years in prison as an accomplice, and in June 1995 several defendants tried in absentia, including Boyerahmadi, were sentenced to life imprisonment. Rad was paroled on 19 May 2010, after serving 16 years of his sentence. He was received as a hero by Islamic Republic officials upon his return home.

=== Aftermath ===
The release of Rad had happened only two days after Tehran freed Clotilde Reiss, a French student accused of spying by the Islamic regime. Both the French and Iranian governments deny the two affairs were linked.

Hours after Bakhtiar's assassination, a British hostage was released from Lebanon, presumably held by Hezbollah, but a French hostage was taken. Although many in the Iranian exile community speculated about official French complicity in Bakhtiar's death, the second kidnapping casts doubt on such theories. The French would seem unlikely to support an operation that included the kidnapping of another French hostage in Lebanon, and there is no apparent connection between the two events.

== Published works ==
Bakhtiar published a memoir in addition to many articles. His books include Ma Fidélité (in French) and 37 Days after 37 Years (in Persian), his biography (highlighting his political career and his beliefs, up to the Iranian Revolution).

== Legacy ==
In the words of the historian Abbas Milani: "more than once in the tone of a jeremiad he reminded the nation of the dangers of clerical despotism, and of how the fascism of the mullahs would be darker than any military junta."

== Personal life ==
Bakhtiar was first married to a French woman, Madeleine, with whom he had four children: sons Guy and Patrick, and daughters Viviane and France. Guy was a French police intelligence unit officer. Viviane died of a heart attack in Cannes on 22 August 1991 following a series of health problems.

Shortly before his death, Bakhtiar divorced his wife and married a young Iranian woman, Shahintaj. With her, he had a son, Goudard, and a stepdaughter, Manijeh Assad. As of 2001, all three were United States citizens. In 2002, a US court awarded his daughter France $305 million in punitive damages against Iran, and in 2008 another judgment held Iran liable for $12 million in compensatory damages to his widow, Shahintaj.

== See also ==
- List of people involved with the French Resistance

Political offices
Preceded by Gholam Reza Azhari	Prime Minister of Iran; 1979	Succeeded by Mehdi Bazargan
Party political offices
Preceded by New Title	Leader of the National Resistance Movement of Iran; 1979–1991	Succeeded by Goudarz Bakhtiar
Preceded by Unknown	Secretary-General of Iran Party; 1978–1979	Succeeded by Abolfazl Qassemi
