= Nojeh coup plot =

1980 failed overthrow of the Islamic Republic of Iran

"Saving Iran's Great Uprising"
- Part of Consolidation of the Iranian Revolution
Date	9–10 July 1980
Location	Planned to start from near Hamadan and undergo in Tehran, Isfahan, Mashhad, Kohgiluyeh and Boyer-Ahmad, Khuzestan and Sistan and Baluchestan
Result	Coup d'état failed: Helped persuade authorities that domestic and foreign actors are trying to destroy the establishment; Office of National Front and its newspaper closed; Revolutionary Guards strengthened; Esprit de corps and strength of Islamic Republic of Iran Army undermined following arrests, executions and purges of 2,000–4,000 personnel; Iraqi Invasion was facilitated; Shapour Bakhtiar was later assassinated in Paris in 1991

Government-Insurgents
Iran: Government of Islamic Republic of Iran; Cabinet of Rajai; Revolutionary Council; Mojahedin of the Islamic Revolution Organization Intelligence aid: Tudeh Party (alleged)	Azadegan Organization: Neqab Organisation; Iran Patriotic Officers (NUPA); Supported by: Iraq (alleged)

Commanders and leaders
(Iran) Ruhollah Khomeini; (Iran) Abolhassan Banisadr; (Iran) Mohammad-Ali Rajai	Shapour Bakhtiar X; Manucher Ghorbanifar; Saeid Mahdioun (executed); Ayat Mohaqeqi (executed); Mohammad Baqer Bani-Ameri; Hadi Izadi (executed)

Units involved
Second Bureau of Army; Revolutionary Guards: Intelligence Unit; Revolutionary Committees; Prime Ministry Intelligence Office	Retired and active-duty personnel from: Nojeh Air Base; 23rd Commando Division; 1st Infantry Division; 92nd Armored Division; 1st Marine Battalion; Shahrbani

Strength
	700–750 military personnel; 300–400 civilians (~100 in Tehran)

Casualties and losses
1 KIA	More than 10 killed; 284 arrested; 144 executed

The "Saving Iran's Great Uprising" (Persian: نجات قیام ایران بزرگ; acronymed NEQAB, Persian: نقاب, lit. 'Mask') more commonly known as the Nojeh coup d'état (Persian: کودتای نوژه, romanized: Kūdetâ-ye Nowžeh), was a plan to overthrow the newly established Islamic Republic of Iran and its government of Abolhassan Banisadr and Ruhollah Khomeini.

== Plan ==
The plan involved officers and servicemen from the infantry, air force, army and secret service, and was largely halted by the arrest of hundreds of officers on 9–10 July 1980 at Nojeh Air Base, near Hamedan, although substantial sabotage damage had already been carried out, with only 28 tanks (of 159) operational in the frontline Khuzestan Province. The plan was organised by Colonel Muhammad Baqir Bani-Amiri, a retired Gendarmerie officer, with the Shah's last Prime Minister, Shapour Bakhtiar, contributing financial support and providing his contacts and authority. Bakhtiar's liaison with the conspirators in Iran was the businessman Manucher Ghorbanifar, who headed the logistics branch of the Niqab network which organised the civilian part of the plot. Bakhtiar told the plotters the United States "had given [the coup] its blessing," but "he was lying" as the U.S. "knew nothing about the Nojeh operation and would likely have opposed it on the grounds that it would endanger the lives of the [American] hostages" still held in Iran.

== Failed coup ==
According to then-President Abolhassan Banisadr, the government discovered eight major cells, and exposed the plotters' plan, leading to the arrests: "their plan was to give the appearance of a coup d'etat to restore the Shah, while the real aim was to provide a pretext to cover the Iraqi invasion. According to the information we received, the conspirators had set up a military camp in [the Iraqi city of] Sulimanieh and planned to ignite a Kurdish revolt and organize demonstrations throughout Iran. Their strategy was simple: internal disorders would first disperse Iranian military forces, so that on the very first day of the Iraqi attack Saddam could occupy the whole Western part of the country." After the failure of the coup, Khomeini delivered a speech in Jamaran Huseinieh and said, "they want to plot, and this type of plot. Even if we were not to neutralize it, people would suffocate it. … Suppose their phantoms were able to take off, what then they could do. The nation is not asleep that a phantom or two could do anything."

== After coup ==
Khomeini ordered those arrested for involvement in the coup to be executed, but Banisadr used legal ruses to delay the executions, and when Iraq invaded, most were freed on the promise of a return to active duty. 144 participants were however executed, and in the following months 2,000–4,000 military personnel dismissed. An assassination attempt was made on Shapour Bakhtiar in Paris on 18 July, and on 22 July Ali Akbar Tabatabaei, the former Iranian press attache in the US, was assassinated in Bethesda, Maryland.
