= Ahmad Qavam =

Five time prime minister of Iran (1873–1955)

- احمد قوام
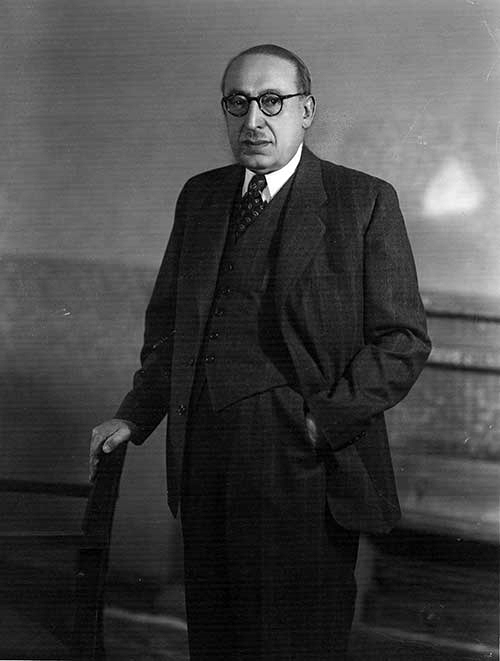

15th Prime Minister of Iran
- In office 17 July 1952 – 22 July 1952
- Monarch: Mohammad Reza Pahlavi
- Preceded by: Mohammad Mosaddegh
- Succeeded by: Mohammad Mosaddegh
- In office 28 January 1946 – 18 December 1947
- Monarch: Mohammad Reza Pahlavi
- Preceded by: Ebrahim Hakimi
- Succeeded by: Ebrahim Hakimi
- In office 9 August 1942 – 15 February 1943
- Monarch: Mohammad Reza Pahlavi
- Preceded by: Ali Soheili
- Succeeded by: Ali Soheili
- In office 22 June 1922 – 15 February 1923
- Monarch: Ahmad Shah Qajar
- Preceded by: Hassan Pirnia
- Succeeded by: Mostowfi ol-Mamalek
- In office 4 June 1921 – 21 January 1922
- Monarch: Ahmad Shah Qajar
- Preceded by: Zia'eddin Tabatabaee
- Succeeded by: Hassan Pirnia

Personal details
- Born: 2 January 1873 Tehran, Sublime State of Persia
- Died: 23 July 1955 (aged 82) Tehran, Imperial State of Iran
- Resting place: Fatima Masumeh Shrine
- Party: Democrat Party
- Other political affiliations: Reformers' Party (1920s)
- Spouse(s): Shazdeh Khanoom (divorced); Zahra Alizadeh (divorced); Zahra Delshad
- Children: 1
- Nickname: Old Fox

Ahmad Qavam (Persian: احمد قوام; 2 January 1873 – 23 July 1955), also known as Qavam os-Saltaneh (Persian: قوام السلطنه), was an Iranian politician who served as Prime Minister of Iran five times.

== Early life ==
Ahmad Qavam was born in 1873 to the prominent Mostowfian Ashtiani family. His uncle, Amin al-Dowleh, was a Prime Minister of Iran. Hasan Vossug, who also served as Iran's Prime Minister twice, was his older brother. Qavam served in the court of Naser al-Din Shah Qajar early in his career and obtained the title os-Saltaneh during the Constitutional Revolution of Iran in 1909. The letter signed by Mozaffar ad-Din Shah Qajar in acceptance of the Constitutional Revolution was written by Qavam, who had the title of Dabir-e Hozoor (Private Secretary) at the time. Qavam became Prime Minister several times during both the Qajar and Pahlavi eras. Twice he played a significant role in preventing the Soviet Union from annexing Iran's northern provinces.

== Political career ==
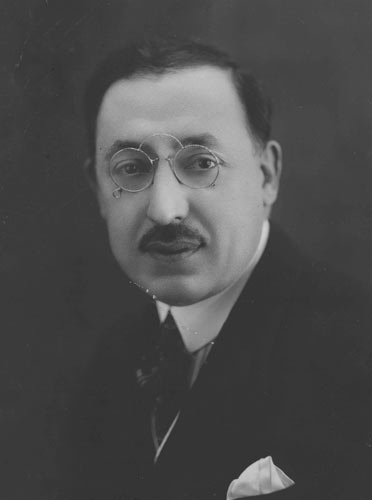

Qavam was appointed governor of Khorasan province in 1918, during which time he responded to the ongoing famine and the Spanish flu pandemic. He was a hardliner administrator and banned some of the newspapers which had been published in the region.

In 1921, during the coup d'état of Tehran against the Qajar government, Tabatabaee ordered Colonel Pessian to arrest many of the opposition, among them Ahmad Qavam.

However, with the fall of Tabatabaee's government and the refusal by Mostowfi ol-Mamalek and others to accept the position of Prime Minister due to the unstable political situation, Qavam, just released from the Ishratabad prison of Tehran, was offered the position. He accepted and became Prime Minister in circumstances so unusual that Iraj Mirza wrote the following verses:

"One day in prison he is thrown,
another day the King's chair he'll own"

Qavam in fact ordered the arrest of Seyyed Zia'eddin Tabatabaee in an incident 25 years later. He also ordered the crackdown on the revolt of Colonel Pessian which he crushed with the aid of Reza Pahlavi.

Of the major events that occurred during his terms as the Prime Minister, was his invitation to Arthur Millspaugh for assisting the government in its finances. Another was the riots of 1942 for economic hardship. He appointed Sepahbod Ahmad Amir-Ahmadi to restore order and end the riots, which he did forcefully. Qavam was also instrumental in the 1942 Tripartite Treaty between Iran, Russia, and Britain.

He was again voted Prime Minister on 26 January 1946 with a slim margin in the Majlis of 52–51. The Majlis thought he would have the best chance of resolving the Soviet-inspired rebellion of the occupied Azerbaijan province since Qavam was the largest property owner in the region. Qavam did not disappoint. He ordered the Iranian delegation to the UN to negotiate issues pending before the Security Council directly with the Soviet delegation. He then flew to Moscow to discuss the issues personally with Joseph Stalin.

When the Soviets violated the terms of the Tripartite Pact which called for all foreign military forces to be withdrawn from Iranian territory by 2 March 1946, it drew a strong rebuke from the Parliamentary Whip, Mohammed Mossadegh.

Qavam arranged a deal with the Soviets, granting an oil concession in the North contingent on the approval of the Majlis after the elections. Under the terms of the agreement with Qavam, Soviet troops began withdrawing from Iran. When the new Majlis was seated, they immediately voted against the proposed Soviet oil concession. This earned Qavam the congenial title, "The Old Fox". It also caused significant opposition against him led by Atesh and its editor Mehdi Mir Ashrafi and Mard-i Imruz and its editor Mohammad Masud who publicly argued that Qavam should be killed due to the oil deal with the Soviets.

== Death ==
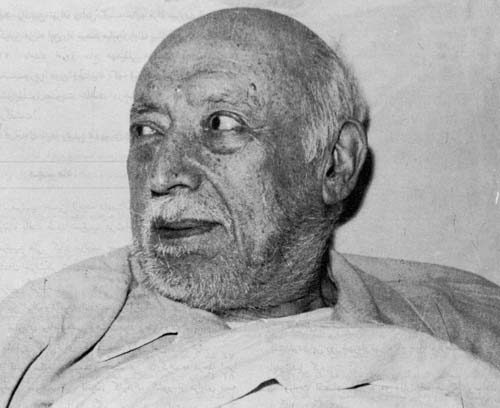
Qavam, 1955

Qavam died at the age of 82 in 1955 in Tehran. He was survived by his second wife and his only son, Hossein.

== See also ==
- Pahlavi dynasty
- List of prime ministers of Iran
- Reza Shah
- Mohammad Reza Shah
- Abdolhossein Teymourtash
- Ali-Akbar Davar
- Javad Ameri

== Other sources ==
- T'Alí Rizā Awsatí. (2003). Iran in the Past Three Centuries (Irān dar Se Qarn-e Goz̲ashteh), Volumes 1 and 2 (Paktāb Publishing, Tehran, Iran, 2003). ISBN 964-93406-6-1 (Vol. 1), ISBN 964-93406-5-3 (Vol. 2).
- Hamid Shokat, Caught in the Crossfire: A Political Biography of Ahmad Qavam [English Language], (ِIbex Publishers). ISBN 978-1-58814-186-6.
- Hamid Shokat. (2006). Dar Tir Rase Hadese, The political life of Qavam osSaltaneh. Tehran, ISBN 9789648897142. Published by akhtaranbook (www.akhtaranbook.com)

Political offices
| Preceded by Zia'eddin Tabatabaee | Prime Minister of Iran; 1921–1922 | Succeeded by Hassan Pirnia |
| Preceded by Hassan Pirnia | Prime Minister of Iran; 1922–1923 | Succeeded by Mostowfi ol-Mamalek |
| Preceded by Ali Soheili | Prime Minister of Iran; 1942–1943 | Succeeded by Ali Soheili |
| Preceded by Ebrahim Hakimi | Prime Minister of Iran; 1946–1947 | Succeeded by Mohammad-Reza Hekmat |
| Preceded by Mohammad Mossadegh | Prime Minister of Iran; 1952 | Succeeded by Mohammad Mossadegh |
Party political offices
| Vacant Party founded | Leader of the Democrat Party of Iran; 1946–1948 | Vacant Party dissolved |
Honorary titles
| Preceded by Mohammad Mosaddegh | First deputy of Tehran; 1947 | Succeeded by Mohammad Mosaddegh |
