= Norman Darbyshire =

British MI6 operative who led the 1953 coup d'état that overthrew Mohammed Mossadegh

- Norman Darbyshire, picture first published in 2019 documentary Coup 53
- Born: Norman Matthew Darbyshire; 1 October 1924
- Died: 17 June 1993 (aged 68)
- Other name: Gordon Somerset
- Spouses: Manon Eiryd Arvor (m. 1948); Virginia C. Fell (m. 1963)
- Children: 6; 3 daughters and 3 sons
- Espionage activity
- Country: United Kingdom
- Agency: Special Operations Executive; Secret Intelligence Service
- Operations: 1953 Iranian coup d'état

Norman Darbyshire (1924–1993) was a British spy who worked for the SOE and the MI6. He played a key role in the 1953 coup d'état that overthrew Mohammed Mossadegh, the democratically-elected prime minister of Iran.

== Espionage career ==
Darbyshire was recruited into the Special Operations Executive and then joined the Secret Intelligence Service following its dissolution. He spent much of his career in the Middle East, in Iran, Lebanon, Egypt and Bahrain.

Darbyshire was fluent in the Persian language and spent three spells in Iran, being first sent to the World War II Anglo-Soviet occupied country in late 1943, age 19, for a mission lasting until the middle of 1947. During this period, he shared a house with Robin Zaehner and was in touch with the Rashidian Brothers. Darbyshire and Zaehner traveled to Jerusalem, Palestine in 1947 and set up a radio aimed at Iranian audience using the Near East Broadcasting Station facilities.

He was posted to Iran again in late 1949 and continued to conduct covert operations with official cover. On 11 June 1950, he became the vice-consul in Mashhad before being transferred to Tehran and officially appointed as the Third Secretary at the British Embassy on 1 April 1951, in fact a promotion as the deputy to Monty Woodhouse in MI6 Tehran station. Aside from controlling the Rashidian network through Samuel Falle as intermediary, during the second spell in Iran he was directly in touch with Mohammad Reza Shah, "more on a social basis", and influencing him indirectly via figures like Ernest Perron. Darbyshire handled dozens of agents, both for intelligence-gathering and black operations. He had a number of deputies in the Iranian Parliament on the payroll who voted and spoke as they were instructed, as well as entryists in the communist Tudeh Party, the Lankarani brothers, who organized mobs attacking mosques and public places in the name of the party.

In October 1952, the Iranian government closed down the British embassy and evicted all its staff, including Darbyshire. As a result, he was formally transferred to the British Middle East Office in Cairo on 26 October 1952, but actually replaced Woodhouse as the MI6 spymaster responsible for Iran, taking over the MI6 Iran station-in-exile located in Nicosia, Cyprus. He kept in touch with almost all assets inside Iran, most notably Rashidians, using radio transmissions and asked CIA's Kermit Roosevelt Jr. to join their coup d'état plan. Among other things, he was involved in the kidnapping, torture, and assassination of General Mahmoud Afshartous, Mossadegh's chief of police, and bribed the Shah's twin sister Princess Ashraf Pahlavi to play a key role in the coup and to eventually become a power behind his resulting dictatorship. Darbyshire, on behalf of Prime Minister Winston Churchill, along with his American counterpart Stephen Meade who spoke for Secretary of State Foster Dulles, met with Princess Ashraf and persuaded her to return to Tehran and convince her brother to cooperate with their plan. Therefore he directed the British side of the coup by radio contact from Cyprus, controlling the street mobs, thugs, prostitutes and military officers who were paid off by the Rashidians.

On 3 August 1954 he was transferred to the Foreign Office. When the Suez Crisis took place, Darbyshire was the station chief in Geneva, under cover as the consul since 20 April 1956. There he made contact with members of the Muslim Brotherhood with an aim to destabilize Egypt under leadership of Gamal Abdel Nasser.

He had the same position in Bahrain, under cover as the First Secretary from 8 November 1958 onward. He was responsible for liaison with Oman's Internal Security Service (mainly staffed with British officers) and coordinating between the MI6, the Special Air Service and Military Intelligence during the Jebel Akhdar War. In that capacity, he also worked closely with Mossad and SAVAK against influence of the Nasserite movement. In July 1960, he was called back to London. He worked in the group vetting the information provided by Soviet defector Oleg Penkovsky.

Darbyshire returned to Tehran as station chief in 1963, on a mission lasting until 1967.

In 1968, Darbyshire was transferred to Whitehall where he worked as a SIS diplomat responsible for handling Iraqi defector, Lawrence De Souza before moving to the British Embassy in Beirut, Lebanon taking the position of First Secretary. Darbyshire returned to Whitehall in 1973 and retired from the SIS in 1978. He died in Britain in June 1993 of a heart attack.

== Portrayal in film and television ==
In the 2019 documentary Coup 53 by Taghi Amirani, actor Ralph Fiennes plays the part of Darbyshire.

== Awards ==
- Member of the Most Excellent Order of the British Empire (1953)
- Officer of the Most Excellent Order of the British Empire (1961)
