= Ernest Perron =

Swiss courtier

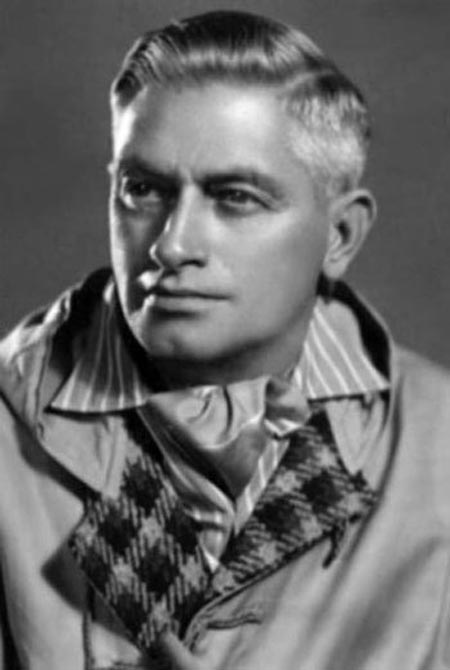
Ernest Perron

Ernest Perron (29 June 1908 – 1961) was a Swiss courtier in Iran during the reign of Shah Mohammad Reza Pahlavi.

Perron had been a servant in a college at Rolle, Switzerland, where he taught the future Shah to appreciate French literature. When Mohammad Reza returned to Iran, he took Perron with him, eventually appointing him as his private secretary, and they enjoyed an exceptionally close friendship, which puzzled and offended many. Perron aroused much enmity as an upstart servant with delusions of grandeur, as well as being overtly homosexual.

During the Abadan Crisis in 1953–1954, he was involved in negotiations as an agent for the Shah; he offered to bypass the cabinet and exclude the prime minister from the negotiations with the British; the offer was rejected, revealed by the British and led to his public dismissal.

== Biography ==
=== Early life ===
The son of a gardener and handyman Achille Perron, who worked at the Institut Le Rosey in Rolle, Switzerland, Perron first met the crown prince of Iran, Mohammad Reza, while the latter was a student there between 1931–36.

A "short and thin man, almost fragile", Perron lived in the servants' quarters of Le Rosey and fantasized about being a great poet, reciting his poetry at all times. Perron worked at Le Rosey as a janitor and gardener, and most considered him a ridiculous figure, the janitor who thought of himself as a great poet. Perron, an eccentric, effeminate man who dressed in a campy style, walked with a limp (due to having contracted polio) and as Perron did nothing to hide his homosexuality he was often beaten up by the students in what might today be deemed gay-bashing. One day, Mohammad Reza came to his defense, and the two became best friends despite Perron being more than ten years the younger man's senior.

Perron had only a high school education, but he read widely and impressed Mohammad Reza with his knowledge of French literature, poetry and philosophy. Besides for his love of poetry, Perron was known for being both openly gay and a devout Catholic who ultimately persuaded the Shah's older sister Princess Shams Pahlavi to convert to Catholicism. Perron introduced Mohammad Reza to French poetry and as Mohammad Reza later recalled under his influence Chateaubriand and Rabelais "become my favorite French authors".

In 1935, the British Legation in Bern reported to London that Perron was "the most oddest young man...who appears to be the Prince's chief guide, philosopher and friend. He is apparently engaged as a sort of Super-Servant for the prince in Switzerland". Perron introduced Mohammad Reza to French poetry while Mohammad Reza took his best friend with him on weekend trips to the Bern house of Anoushirvan Sepahbodi, the Iranian ambassador to Switzerland, where he introduced Perron to Persian food, which he loved. Besides enjoying Persian cooking, Perron and Mohammad Reza spent hours at Sepahbodi's house listening to Persian and classical music with Mozart and Bach being particular favorites.

Perron's devout Catholicism gave Mohammad Reza someone outside of his immediate family who had the certainty of faith, of believing that there was a just, omnipotent God out there to look after one, which appealed to the teenage crown prince. Though the relationship between Mohammad Reza and Perron has caused much speculation, it seems that Mohammad Reza lost his virginity to a maid who worked at Le Rosey in 1935. The crown prince liked Perron so much that when he returned to Iran in 1936, he brought Perron back with him, installing his best friend in the Marble Palace.

In a report from 1936, Perron was described by the British Embassy in Tehran as "a curious fellow...dressed like a musical comedy Bohemian who also writes characters from hand-writing and from the palm of your hand and makes the most surprising statements of the strength of it about your vie sexuelle!...It is rather alarming that such an odd specimen should have such a hold on the prince. The Belgian Charge here, a most sensible fellow, has said that he would not entrust any young man to Monsieur Perron, let alone a future monarch; and his description of him as un exalté, un illuminé, un mystique is just about right."

Reza Shah strongly disapproved of Perron for his homosexuality and tried to send him back to Switzerland, but was persuaded by his children to allow him to stay. Reza Shah's first reaction to Perron was to attack him with his riding crop and beat him bloody, and although the crown prince persuaded the Shah to let Perron stay, Reza Shah demoted Perron down to a gardener at the Marble Palace. In 1939, Perron started to write newspaper articles about Iran for Swiss newspapers and by 1941 was an "employee" of the crown prince, though he was unable to provide a job description to foreign diplomats about what he was actually doing. By 1942 he was working for the French embassy in Tehran as a translator. In 1942, Perron worked as a messenger for Mohammad Reza, now the Shah of Iran, carrying letters back and forth between him and his father, Reza Shah, who had abdicated as a result of the Anglo-Soviet invasion of Iran and been exiled by the British to South Africa in September 1941.

After the arrest and imprisonment of Mossadegh in 1936 Perron helped secure his release in 1941 after Mossadegh's son, who was Perron's doctor, asked him for help.

=== Private secretary to the Shah: Iran's second most powerful man ===
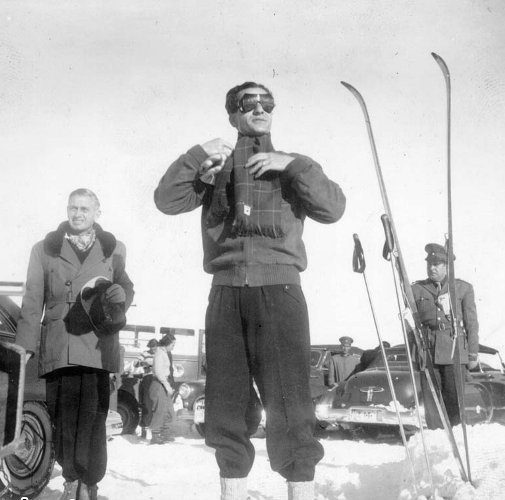
Perron (left) with Mohammad Reza Pahlavi, 1961 or earlier

In 1943, Perron became the private secretary to the Shah, a job he retained until 1954. As private secretary, Perron controlled access to the Shah while also working as the court poet and philosopher. Reflecting his lack of education beyond high school graduation, Perron felt uncomfortable dealing with diplomats and asked the Swiss ambassador to give him advice about how to improve his social graces. Perron became very friendly with Mohammad Mosaddegh with Mosaddegh's son Gholam Hossein Mosaddegh remembering Perron as a "very good", "very pure" and "very religious man". Perron was used as intermediary between Mohammad Reza and Mosaddegh, being the only person allowed to enter the Shah's bedroom other than his wife and mistresses. George Middleton, the British ambassador to Iran called Perron a "court jester" who was only allowed his position at the court because he could make Mohammad Reza laugh, but others remembered him as a ruthless intriguer who was forever plotting to keep his position as the Shah's best friend and the second most powerful man in Iran, the Shah's favorite advisor and the man who controlled access to the Shah. Such was Perron's power to make or break careers that many in the Iranian elite found it expedient to cultivate him and always stay in his good graces by providing him with intelligence, which further enhanced his power. As Perron's Persian was less than perfect, he often served as the Shah's favored emissary with the British, American, Swiss and French embassies in Tehran. As a foreigner who could not own land in Iran nor had any important court position, Perron was completely dependent upon Mohammad Reza for power, which explains why he was trusted with such power by the Shah.

The Shah's twin sister Princess Ashraf Pahlavi had a relationship with Mehrpour Teymourtash, but over time found herself being more and more attracted to his younger brother Houshang. Ultimately, Princess Ashraf decided to marry Houshang Teymourtash, but he was then visited by Perron who had a message from the Shah. The father of the Teymourtash brothers was Abdolhossein Teymourtash, an important minister under Reza Shah, who is generally believed to have died as a result of drinking "Qajar coffee" in 1933 (i.e. poisoned as the Qajar Shahs were infamous for killing their enemies with poisoned coffee), and Mohammad Reza did not want his sister to marry a man whose father had been killed by their father. Ashraf recalled:

"Realizing how attached I was to Houshang, my brother had sent his friend Ernest Perron to see him. "The Shah doesn't doubt the sincerity of your feelings for his sister", Perron told Houshang, "but His Imperial Majesty knows his sister and he knows that a marriage to you will cause her suffering and unhappiness. If you really love her, you will not attempt to see her again".

With that, Teymourtash ceased seeing Ashraf.

The Shah's second wife Soraya Esfandiary-Bakhtiari hated Perron, writing in her memoirs "How can I describe this shaytun [a Persian term that roughly translates as a "trouble maker"] and limping devil who dragged his leg and spread his poison around the palace as well as our own quarters?" Queen Soraya called Perron "a homosexual who detested women, all women", a "cunning, perfidious and Machiavellian" man who "roused hatred, stirred gossip, reveled in every intrigue". Much to her disgust, Mohammad Reza Shah was "fascinated with this diabolical Swiss" who professed to be a "philosopher, poet, and a prophet"; the two men met every morning to discuss all the affairs of state in French as Perron was the man whose advice the Shah valued the most, and, as the queen soon learned, other matters were discussed as well. Queen Soraya wrote about Perron's daily visits to the Shah: "He visited him each morning in his bedroom for a discussion. No one could say precisely what it was he did". Much to her revulsion, Perron visited her one day in late 1951 and made a series of what she called very "lewd" remarks about her sex life with the Shah, intersected with equally vulgar questions, which led her to throw him out of the Marble Palace in her fury. Perron lived openly with the commercial attaché of the Swiss embassy in Tehran. A Freemason who belonged to the Pahlavi lodge, Perron was a friend of some of the most powerful men in Iran and sometimes passed on information to MI6, the British intelligence service. A MI6 officer, Norman Darbyshire who handled relations with Perron later called him "that terrible man".

In December 1953, the British diplomat Denis Wright secretly visited Tehran and met with Perron and Bahram Shahrokh, who had worked as a broadcaster for Radio Berlin during World War II, who were the Shah's agents for talks about the future of the Anglo-Iranian Oil Company. Britain had broken off diplomatic relations with Iran in 1951 during the Abadan Crisis. During their talks, Perron and Shahrokh wanted British support if Mohammad Reza Shah were to dismiss both Hossein Ala' and the prime minister General Fazlollah Zahedi. At a Christmas party, Perron and Shahrokh handed Wright a note saying that all communication with the Shah were to be through them with the Iranian cabinet being excluded and that the Shah wanted a settlement of the oil question in a way that was "face-saving" for him. Wright refused those terms and informed General Zahedi of the Shah's attempts to bypass him, leading to an angry scene where Zahedi "berated" Mohammad Reza Shah for attempting to exclude him from talks with the British. Mohammad Reza Shah blamed Perron for this fiasco and fired him in January 1954. Afterwards, Perron moved into a palace with Princess Shams as the two shared a common interest in Catholicism.

Around this time he also met and struck up a friendship and correspondence with the French historian Alain Daniélou

=== Death ===
Perron died in 1961 in Zürich from an illness.

== Legacy ==
After the Islamic Revolution, a best-selling book was published by the new regime, Ernest Perron, the Husband of the Shah of Iran by Mohammad Pourkian, alleging a homosexual relationship between the Shah and Perron, which remains the official interpretation in the Islamic Republic. The American psychologist Marvin Zonis wrote that the Pourkian's book is long on assertions and short on evidence of a homosexual relationship between the two men. Zonis argued against the theory of Perron having a homosexual relationship with the Shah, noting that all of the Shah's courtiers denied that Perron was the Shah's lover whom they all describe as a womanizer, and maintained that the strong-willed Reza Shah, who was very homophobic, would not have allowed Perron to move into the Marble Palace in 1936 if he believed Perron was his son's lover.

One courtier recalled Perron as "a warm man, completely devoted to the Shah. He was grateful for the life-style which the Shah provided him and tried to repay his friend with advice and service. But the Shah was never intimate with him nor would he allow Perron to intrigue in court matters." One of Mohammad Reza Shah's mistresses stated: "Perron was used by the Shah to carry his wishes to members of the court, he had no sexual relationship to the Shah whatsoever". Zonis wrote: "No one who was a member of court circles in the period of Perron's involvement supports the rumors of a homosexual tie between the Shah and his Swiss friend...Whether or no manifest sexuality was a part of their relation, there clearly was an extraordinary close bond between the two. That bond, as measured by its intensity and duration, suggests how significant Perron was for the Shah". The Iranian-American historian Abbas Milani argued Perron was Mohammad Reza's "self-object", a person somebody chooses to act as an extension of their personality and to booster their self-esteem. Milani argued that, given the way that the macho Reza Shah had often attacked his son for a lack of manliness and said he wanted his son to have a "manly education", for the heterosexual Mohammad Reza having an effeminate man like Perron around eased his doubts about his own masculinity.

=== General Fardoust's claims ===
In 1988, Iranian television aired the purported confessions of General Hossein Fardoust, who himself had also been a childhood friend of the Shah, a few weeks before his death where he claimed Perron had been "planted" at Le Rosey as a British spy. In 1991, the newspaper Kayhan-e Hava'i published what were allegedly Fardoust's memoirs, which were summarized by the Iranian-American historian Ervand Abrahamian as: "These claimed that Perron had been planted by the British in Le Rosey to seduce the young shah; that Perron headed a homosexual clique among the courtiers and the Freemasons; and that he continued to work for MI6 until his death in 1961, when his espionage role was taken over by Dr. Ayadi, a Bahai veterinary surgeon who had cured the Shah of a psychosomatic ailment. Ayadi was described as the Rasputin of Iran.

These memoirs also elaborated on the theme that Mosaddeq was a British agent. They argued that Mosaddeq could not have attained high positions in the 1920s without London's support and that his close friend Alam was a "well-known" British agent. To top it all, the memoirs claimed that Mosaddeq, because of these foreign ties, had consciously helped MI6 and the CIA carry out the coup against himself". Abrahamian, citing Richard Hofstadter's 1964 essay The Paranoid Style in American Politics wrote that Iranian politics from the 19th century to this day was and is characterized by the "paranoid style" as Iranians have an astonishing capacity for inventing fanciful conspiracy theories to explain their history, and as such, the mysterious Perron often features as one of the players in these conspiracy theories. Daniela Meier wrote that there is a vast literature in Iran that depicts Perron as an American and/or British agent and the Shah as Perron's puppet, which she observed tended to exaggerate his power.
