= Abolhasan Haerizadeh =

Iranian politician and judge (1894–1987)

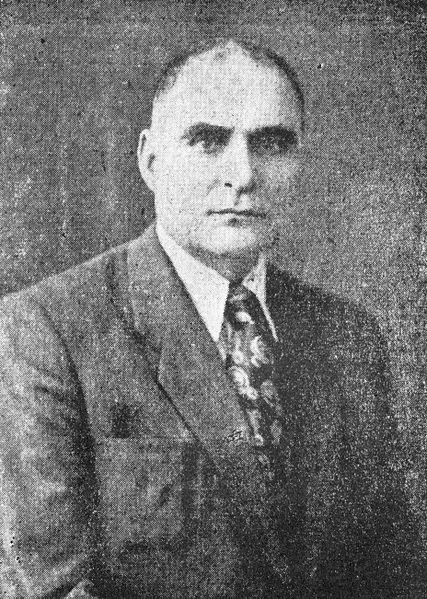

Member of Parliament
- In office 18 March 1954 – 15 April 1956
- Constituency: Tehran
- In office 27 April 1952 – 16 August 1953
- Constituency: Tehran
- In office 25 April 1950 – 19 February 1952
- Constituency: Tehran
- In office 12 June 1947 – 28 July 1949
- Constituency: Sabzevar
- In office 11 July 1926 – 13 August 1928
- Constituency: Yazd
- In office 12 February 1924 – 11 February 1926
- Constituency: Yazd
- In office 22 June 1921 – 11 June 1923
- Constituency: Yazd

Personal details
- Born: Seyyed Abolhasan Haerizadeh; 1894
- Died: 1987 (aged 92–93)
- Party: Democrat Party (1946–1947); National Front (1949–1952)

Seyyed Abolhasan Haerizadeh (Persian: سید ابوالحسن حائری‌زاده; 1894–1987) was an Iranian judge and politician. He was a member of Parliament of Iran for three consecutive terms between 1921 and 1928 and another four consecutive terms from 1947 to 1956.

== Political affiliation ==
Haerizadeh was an opponent of Reza Shah in the fourth, fifth and sixth parliamentary terms. He was a close ally of Abol-Ghasem Kashani in the 1925 anti-republican campaign. He was elected to the fifteenth term by a Democrat Party ticket and as a supporter of Ahmad Qavam, but he crossed the floor and organized the protest against the government. Haerizadeh was a member of the National Front and supported Mohammad Mosaddegh, but left the front in 1952 and turned against Mosadegh. He maintained close ties to the bazaari class.

Honorary titles
Preceded by Hossein Makki	First deputy of Tehran; 1954	Succeeded by Fathollah Foroud
