= Donald Wilber =

American writer and spy (1907–1997)

Donald Newton Wilber (November 14, 1907, Wisconsin – February 2, 1997, Princeton, New Jersey), American writer and spy.

Wilber, along with MI6 agent Norman Darbyshire was one of the two principal architects of the MI6-CIA project "Operation Ajax" (or "Operation Boot" as it was called by the British), a successful plot to overthrow the government of Iranian Prime Minister Mohammad Mossadeq. The plot replaced Iran's first democratically elected Prime Minister with General Fazlollah Zahedi; the government fell back into the hands of its disempowered Mohammad Reza Shah Pahlavi, who had supported the coup.

Wilber served as a United States intelligence officer with the Office of Strategic Services (OSS), and was an active participant in the power struggles of nations, especially during the rivalry between the United States and the Soviet Union in Iran after World War II.

In addition to orchestrating the coup in Iran, in his spare time, Wilber wrote histories, travelogues and commentaries on Iran, Afghanistan and Sri Lanka. He was considered an authority on ancient Persia.

== Background ==
Wilber studied the ancient and modern Middle East. He received his A.B. (1929), M.F.A., and Ph.D. (1949) from Princeton University, where he was the first student to receive a doctorate in architectural history.

In 1939 Wilber married Margaret Patterson Surre; they had two daughters, Sara Wilber Cohen and Margaret Newton Wilber, who later changed her name to Valentine Margaret Wilber.

His book, Iran, Past and Present, was published in nine editions. Wilber collected oriental rugs and was president of the Princeton Rug Society for many years. He spent forty years in the Middle East.

His memoir, which partially recounts his role in the coup, is Adventures in the Middle East: Excursions and Incursions.

== Publications ==
Wilber is the author of articles and books, including:

- Riza Shah Pahlavi: The Resurrection and Reconstruction of Iran, 1878-1944 - Exposition Press New York - 1975 - ISBN 978-0-682-48206-6, Mazda Publishers - 2016 - ISBN 978-1-56859-299-2
- The Islamic Architecture of Iran and Turan: The Timurid Period (with Lisa Golombek, Princeton University Press, 2 vols.)
- Iran, Past and Present (Princeton University Press)
- The Architecture of Islamic Iran: The Il Khanid Period (Princeton University Press)
- Persian Gardens and Garden Pavilions (Dumbarton Oaks)
- Pakistan Yesterday and Today (Holt, Rinehart and Winston)
- Persepolis: The Archaeology of Parsa, Seat of the Persian Kings (The Darwin Press, Inc.)
- The Land and People of Ceylon (J. B. Lippincott Company)
- Contemporary Iran (Frederick A. Praeger)
- Adventures in the Middle East: Excursions and Incursions (The Darwin Press, Inc.)
- Afghanistan: Its people, its society, its culture (HRAF PRESS)
