= Hossein Makki =

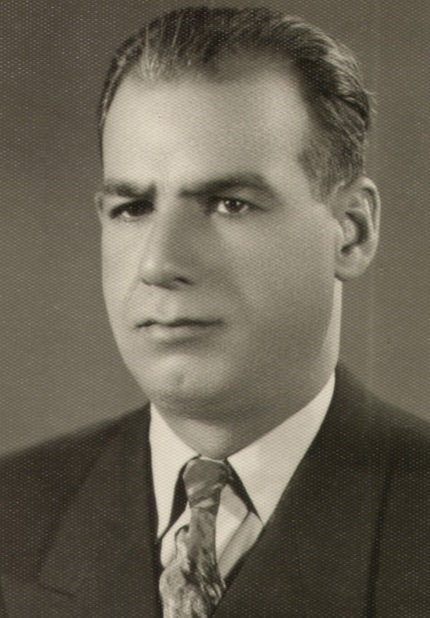

Member of Parliament
- In office 27 April 1952 – 16 August 1953
- Constituency: Tehran
- In office 25 April 1950 – 19 February 1952
- Constituency: Tehran
- In office 12 June 1947 – 28 July 1949
- Constituency: Arak

Personal details
- Born: Seyyed Hossein Makki; 1911 Meybod, Iran
- Died: 8 December 1999 (aged 87–88) Tehran, Iran
- Resting place: Behesht-e Zahra
- Party: Iran Party (1943–1946); Democrat Party (1946–1948); National Front (1949–1952)

Military service
- Allegiance: Iran
- Branch/service: Air Force
- Rank: Sergeant major

Seyyed Hossein Makki (Persian: سید حسین مکی) was an Iranian politician, orator and historian. He was a member of Parliament of Iran for three consecutive terms from 1947 to 1953.

The son of a bazaari merchant, Makki was an employee of National Iranian Railroad Company, having previously served as a non-commissioned officer in the Imperial Iranian Air Force. He began his career as a journalist in 1941 and was a founding member of the Iran Party, as one of the few who was not Western-educated. He left the party as a leading member of Democrat Party of Iran in 1946 and entered the Parliament of Iran as a protégé of Ahmad Qavam in 1947. He left his patron in 1949 to embrace a nationalist cause, befriending Mohammad Mossadegh and co-founding National Front. He actively supported nationalization of the Iran oil industry movement and delivered a filibustering speech that took four days to prevent the oil agreement. He later broke away from Mossadegh and the National Front.

He was briefly imprisoned in 1955 and spent the rest of his life writing about Iranian history, most notably the best-selling eight-volume series Tāriḵ-e bist sāla-ye Irān (Twenty Year History of Iran).

Honorary titles
Preceded by Mohammad Mosaddegh	First deputy of Tehran; 1952	Succeeded by Abolhasan Haerizadeh
