= Amir Amirani =

Iranian-born film director and producer

Amir Amirani (Persian: امیر امیرانی, born July 28, 1967) is an Iranian-born film director and producer.

== Early life and education ==
Born in Iran, Amirani grew up in London.

He earned a degree in biology from the University of Nottingham and an M.Phil. in International Relations from the University of Cambridge. He originally planned to pursue a Ph.D. in that subject as well.

== Career ==
=== BBC ===
Amirani joined the BBC in 1992 as a Graduate Production Trainee.

He was a writer and researcher for a four-part TV series about the Nobel Prizes.

In 1994, he and his brother Taghi founded Amirani Films, which has produced documentaries for the BBC, Channel 4, and other British broadcasters, as well as for PBS and other broadcasters abroad. He has also produced episodes of such BBC Radio 4 series as In Business, From Our Own Correspondent, and The World Tonight, as well as the radio program From Tehran With Laughter.

Between 1995 and 2005, he produced and directed episodes of the TV series Holy Places, Water Week, Picture This, Hollyoaks, This Time Next Year, and Nova.

=== We Are Many ===
He served as writer, director, and cinematographer of the documentary We Are Many, which was released in 2014.

We Are Many is an account of the worldwide protests against the Iraq War on February 15, 2003. "I hope those who come to watch my film We Are Many will see that day in a new light, a day that many, both then and now, regarded as a heroic failure," Amirani has said. He researched the film between 2006 and 2010. It was the first British film to acquire seed funding through Kickstarter, and includes interviews with Tony Benn, Brian Eno, Danny Glover, Richard Branson, Jesse Jackson, Ken Loach, Hans Blix, Noam Chomsky, Mark Rylance, Ron Kovic, and Tariq Ali, among many others. It premiered at the Sheffield International Documentary Festival on June 8, 2014, and went into general release in 2015. It was also screened at the Dubai International Film Festival and the Hay Festival.

"The scales fell from people's eyes," Amirani told The Independent about the 2003 protest. "Up until then, they still had a faith in politics: that there would come a point at which the politicians would have to listen. The realisation that this was not the case was a huge moment." Although the 2003 anti-Iraq War rallies were widely considered a failure, Amirani argues that they helped spark the Egyptian revolution.

=== Recent work ===
In 2014, Amirani recorded a series of video "masterclasses" for the Scottish Documentary Institute, in which he shares advice about filmmaking, including choice of topic, the role of the musical score, funding, and the use of films to promote political causes.

He is co-producer of the 2019 documentary Coup 53, which is about "the 1953 Anglo-American coup d'etat in Iran that changed the course of history." The film, which won the audience award at the 2019 Vancouver International Film Festival for Most Popular International Documentary, is written and directed by his brother Taghi.

=== Other professional activities ===
He has written articles of reportage for the New Statesman, New Scientist, Business Traveller Asia and the Economist Intelligence Unit.

In 2015 he was interviewed on the TV series Democracy Now!

== Politics ==
Amirani is a strong supporter of the Palestinian cause. He has described British controls on immigration as "fascist" and has said that the Labour Party, beginning with Tony Blair, has betrayed the working class. He considers the Iraq War the "crime of the century."

In November 2019, along with other public figures, Amirani signed a letter supporting Labour Party leader Jeremy Corbyn, describing him as "a beacon of hope in the struggle against emergent far-right nationalism, xenophobia and racism in much of the democratic world" and endorsed him for in the 2019 UK general election.

== Honors and awards ==
Amirani was nominated for an Amnesty International Award for his BBC work, and was also nominated for the One World Broadcasting Trust Awards.

== Personal life ==
Amirani lives in London.
