= Assadollah Rashidian =

Iranian politician and businessman

- اسدالله رشیدیان
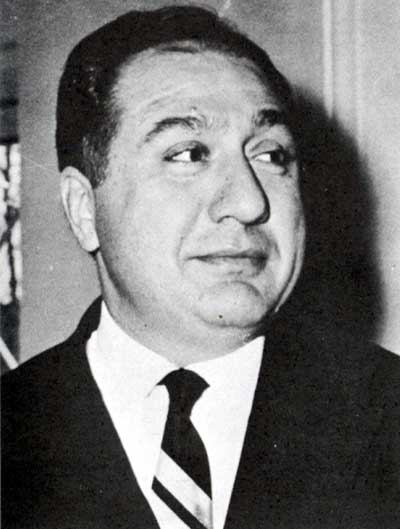

Member of Parliament of Iran
- In office 22 February 1961 – 9 May 1961
- Constituency: Tehran

Personal details
- Born: 1919 Tehran, Iran
- Died: 1980 (aged 61) London, United Kingdom
- Party: National Will Party (1943–1951)

Assadollah Rashidian (Persian: اسدالله رشیدیان) was an Iranian businessman and anglophile who, along with his brothers, played a critical role in the 1953 overthrow of Iranian Prime Minister Mohammed Mossadegh. He was a principal covert agent of the British Secret Intelligence Service (SIS) and through him the U.S. Central Intelligence Agency (CIA) was able to convince the Shah, Mohammed Reza Pahlavi, to endorse the operation (codenamed Operation Ajax).

Rashidian's main contributions to the operation were his encouragement of the Shah's sister, Princess Ashraf Pahlavi, to obtain her brother's approval of the plan, and acting as a liaison between the SIS/CIA team and the Shah once the operation was underway. On 13 October 1952, during the Abadan crisis, the government issued arrest warrants for Assadollah Rashidian, his brother, Abdol Hossein Hejazi, and others. They were soon released.

== Life ==
Rashidian was born in Tehran in 1919. The youngest son of Haibollah Rashidian. His brothers were Saifullah and Qudratullah, and he also had a sister.

His father although playing a part in the coup that brough Reza Shah to power was eventually imprisoned by the shah at Qasr Prison and was only released after the fall of the shah in 1941. His father became an employee of the British embassy and later became an advisor to Zia ol Din Tabatabaee.

When Mossadegh came to power, the elder Rashidian was again imprisoned on suspicion on spying for the British.

Together with his brothers, Rashidian amassed great wealth and during WWII, the family had been cultivated as possible assets by MI16 due to their anglophile leanings and connections to the United Kingdom. This consisted of owning property in London and of sending their children to school in England.

== Education ==
Rashidian attended university in London.

== Marriage ==
In 1957, Rashidian married Lili Daftary, the daughter of a Colonel Daftary and grand niece of Mohammed Mossadegh. Daftary was a friend of Farah Diba. (Note: Not to be confused with Leyly Matine-Daftary, another friend of Diba.)

== Death ==
Rashidian died in 1981 from a heart-attack, while living in exile in London.
