= Azadeh Shafiq =

Iranian royal and politician (1951–2011)

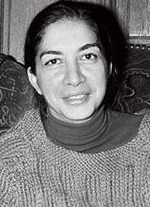
- Born: 1951; Tehran, Pahlavi Iran
- Died: 23 February 2011 (aged 59–60); Paris, France
- Spouse: Farshad Vahid (m. 1972; div. 1975)
- Issue: Kamran Vahid
- House: Pahlavi
- Father: Ahmad Shafiq
- Mother: Ashraf Pahlavi

Azadeh Shafiq (Persian: آزاده شفیق; 1951 – 23 February 2011) was an Iranian royal and a member of the Pahlavi dynasty, being daughter of Ashraf Pahlavi. Following the Iranian revolution that toppled her uncle, Mohammad Reza Pahlavi, she exiled in Paris and involved in opposition activities to the Islamic regime in Iran.

== Early life and education ==
Shafiq was born in 1951. She was the daughter of Ashraf Pahlavi, twin sister of the Shah Mohammad Reza, and her Egyptian second husband, Ahmad Shafiq. She had a brother, Shahriar. Although her parents were divorced in 1960, her father did not return to Egypt and stayed in Tehran to raise his children.

She was educated in German school in Tehran and in France.

== Personal life and activities ==
Shafiq married twice. She married Farshad Vahid in 1972 and they had a son, Kamran (born 1973). She divorced from Vahid in 1975. She later wed a former Iranian military officer.

She began to live in Paris following the Iranian revolution. Later her brother joined her and they shared the Ashraf Pahlavi's residence near Rue Pergolese. They both acted as the Pahlavi family's principal spokesmen. She participated in protests and opposition activities against the Islamic regime. She supported efforts to restore the monarchy in Iran and headed a monarchist group, Free Iran movement in Paris. In 1979 she began to publish a weekly magazine, Iran-e Azad, which was disbanded in the 1980s. She served as a social and humanitarian worker with the Iranian community in Turkey from 1984 to 1991.

== Death ==
Shafiq died of leukemia in Paris on 23 February 2011.
