= Shahriar Shafiq =

Iranian royal and military official

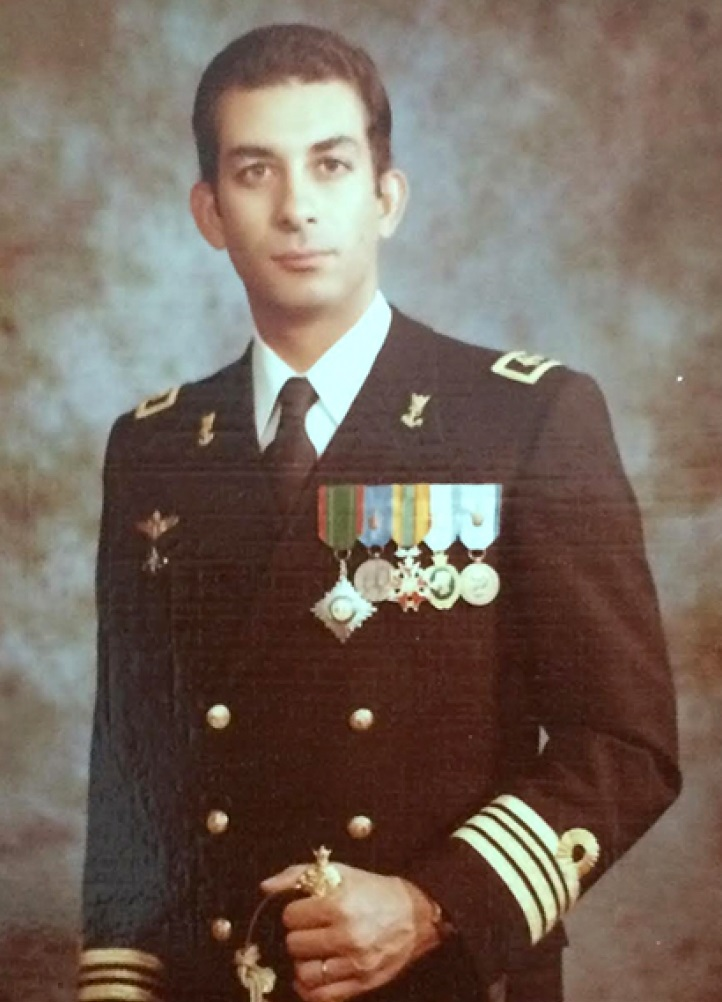
- Formal portrait, c. 1973
- Born: 15 March 1945; Cairo, Kingdom of Egypt
- Died: 7 December 1979 (aged 34); Paris, France
- Spouse: Maryam Eghbal
- Issue: Nader Shafiq; Dara Shafiq
- House: Pahlavi
- Father: Ahmad Shafiq
- Mother: Ashraf Pahlavi

Personal details
- Education: Razi High School; Britannia Royal Naval College

Military service
- Branch/service: Imperial Iranian Navy
- Years of service: 1963–1979
- Rank: Captain

Shahriar Shafiq (Persian: شهریار شفیق; 15 March 1945 – 7 December 1979) was an Egyptian Iranian Imperial Navy Captain and a member of the House of Pahlavi. He was the son of Princess Ashraf Pahlavi, twin sister of the last Shah of Iran, Mohammad Reza Pahlavi.

His military career lasted from 1963 until the Iranian Revolution in 1979. He stayed until March 1979 when he had to escape Iran after months of fighting the revolutionaries.

Shahriar Shafiq resided in Paris until 7 December 1979, when he was assassinated by agents of the Islamic Republic.

== Early life and education ==
Shafiq was born in Cairo on 15 March 1945. He was the son of Ashraf Pahlavi and Ahmad Shafiq (Dir-Gen of Civil Aviation, son of Ahmad Shafiq Pasha, Minister of the Khedivial Court of Egypt), and brother of Azadeh Shafiq.

Shafiq was educated at the Royal Navy College in Dartmouth, the United Kingdom.

== Personal life ==
In 1967, Shafiq married to the daughter of Manouchehr Eghbal, Maryam Eghbal, who had been married at age 18 to Mahmoud Reza Pahlavi in October 1964, one of his uncles and a half-brother of the Shah. Shafiq and Eghbal had two sons: Nader Shafiq (born 15 March 1968) and Dara Shafiq (born 1970).

== Career and activities ==
Shafiq was an Imperial Iranian Navy Captain. He and his cousin Prince Kamyar Pahlavi, son of Abdul Reza Pahlavi, were the only members of the Pahlavi dynasty who chose military careers. Shafiq was the highest-ranking military officer in the Pahlavi family. He worked in the navy of Iran from 1963 to 1979. He served as the commander of the Persian Gulf fleet of Hovercraft before the 1979 revolution.

Additionally, Shafiq was the head of Judo and Karate federation of Iran during the reign of Mohammad Reza Shah.

== Later years and assassination ==
After the revolution of February 1979, he was the only member of the Pahlavi dynasty who stayed in Iran and kept fighting against the revolutionaries, up to the point when he had to flee in a small boat from the Persian Gulf to Kuwait, under heavy fire. He fled Iran in March 1979.

After leaving Iran, Shafiq first went to the United States. Then he joined his family in Paris, France, on 14 November 1979, and began organizing a resistance movement against the Islamic Republic. He founded the group, Iran Azad (Free Iran), which was later led by his sister Azadeh with whom he was living in Paris. They both acted as the Pahlavi family’s principal spokespeople. In Iran, Islamic judge Ayatollah Sadeq Khalkhali tried and sentenced him and other members of the Pahlavi family in absentia to death in a secret trial in the spring of 1979.

Shafiq was assassinated in Paris on 7 December 1979, being shot twice in the head by agents of the Islamic Republic on the Rue Pergolese, outside his mother's home. He was aged 34. The attack was carried out by a masked gunman. Ayatollah Khalkhali claimed that the assassination was carried out by one of his death squads. The Muslim Liberation Group announced that it was responsible for the assassination.

Shahriar's body was not buried, but embalmed and moved to New York City where it was kept by his mother.
