= Coup 53 =

2019 British documentary by Taghi Amirani

- Film poster
- Directed by: Taghi Amirani
- Written by: Taghi Amirani; Walter Murch
- Produced by: Taghi Amirani; Paul Zaentz
- Starring: Ralph Fiennes
- Cinematography: Taghi Amirani; Simon Fanthorpe; Chris Morphet; Claudia Raschke; Vicente Franco; Ben Richards
- Edited by: Walter Murch
- Music by: Robert Miller
- Production company: Amirani Media
- Release date: 31 August 2019 (Telluride Film Festival)
- Running time: 118 minutes
- Country: United Kingdom
- Languages: English; Persian

Coup 53 is a 2019 British documentary about the 1953 Iranian coup d'état to overthrow Iranian prime minister Mohammad Mosaddegh, co-written and directed by Taghi Amirani and co-written and edited by Walter Murch.

== Production ==
The film, directed by Taghi Amirani, was edited and co-written by Walter Murch. Amirani devoted several years of sleuthing to research the story behind the 1953 coup. The film describes the departure of Amirani's family from Iran to England and then follows Amirani as he uncovers the evidence of the plot hatched by British and US intelligence, led by the CIA's Kermit Roosevelt Jr.

Central to the documentary is a series of clips in which actor Ralph Fiennes reads from a transcript of an interview with MI6 agent Norman Darbyshire, who admitted to plotting the coup (codenamed "Operation Ajax") together with the CIA.

== Cast ==
People interviewed by the makers of Coup 53 include:

- Ralph Fiennes as Norman Darbyshire
- Walter Murch as self
- Taghi Amirani as self
- David Talbot as self
- Stephen Kinzer as self
- Ervand Abrahamian as self
- Malcolm Byrne as self

The documentary also draws on footage from an episode of the 1985 UK TV documentary series End of Empire, produced by Granada Television.

== Release ==
Coup 53's world premiere was at the 2019 Telluride Film Festival, and it also played the 2019 BFI London Film Festival. At the 2019 Vancouver International Film Festival, It was released to the general public on 19 August 2020 with an online release in the US, UK, Canada and Ireland through 118 theaters using the platform Eventive. In mid-September 2020, Coup 53 was pulled from its digital distribution platforms. Coup 53 became available again on digital platforms on 18 December 2020.

== Reception ==
Coup 53 has received universally positive reviews from critics. As of November 2026, 100% of the 44 reviews compiled on Rotten Tomatoes are positive, with an average rating of 8/10. This puts Coup 53 in an elite group of only 112 films in all cinema history to have gained an 100% rating (with forty or more positive reviews and no negatives). The website's critics consensus reads: "Rife with the political intrigue promised by its title, Coup 53 is a spellbinding documentary with the heart of a thriller." The critical aggregator Metacritic awarded the film a score of 80 indicating "generally favorable reviews"

Coup 53's positive reviews began with Todd McCarthy's Telluride Film Festival review in The Hollywood Reporter on September 4, 2019, in which he said the film is "passionate and fearless, enormously benefitting from the involvement of the peerless film editor Walter Murch, and has the air of something that grew from an impudent home movie into a magnum opus." During the 2019 BFI London Film Festival, where Coup 53 had its British and European Premiere, Allan Hunter of Screen Daily called the film "as compelling as a John Le Carré novel or a Costa-Gavras classic" with "pulse-racing discoveries" and that director "Taghi Amirani's forensic focus and expert storytelling create a vital docu/drama with the potential to reach far beyond history buffs and conspiracy theorists".

Upon the film's commercial release on 19 August 2020, Ann Hornaday of The Washington Post gave the film four out of four stars and wrote: "It's a nonfiction film that functions precisely as all documentaries should: as a piece of doggedly investigative, personally transparent reporting, and as simply great storytelling, full stop." Later, Hornaday included Coup 53 in her list of best documentaries of 2020. In Empire, Ian Freer wrote: "Part political drama, part history lesson, part gripping spy thriller, Coup 53 gives what has been relegated to a small footnote in Iran's story the big, expansive, dramatic treatment it deserves."

In his NPR Fresh Air review, John Powers said: "An exhilarating... historical documentary that unfolds with the pace and complexity of a thriller." Peter Bradshaw of The Guardian wrote "This powerful and authoritative documentary by the Iranian filmmaker Taghi Amirani is as gripping as any thriller." "Thrills and chills as spectacular Fiennes reveals a very British coup," said Charlotte O'Sullivan in the London Evening Standard. "This unclassifiable yarn...feels like a thriller." She added: "Coup 53 is stranger than fiction and a terrifying reminder that the past never goes away." Joe Morgenstern of The Wall Street Journal called Coup 53 "a formidable achievement" adding "As history lessons go, this is a powerful one in which a wealth of interviews and stunning graphics have been pulled together, with extraordinary attention to detail, into an intricate but lucid whole." Tim Robey of The Daily Telegraph called Coup 53 "A labour of love, the film is premium detective work. Taghi Amirani's documentary, years in the making, unearths an astonishing confession from a British intelligence officer." From Tara Brady of The Irish Times: "A maddening, gripping portrait of how imperialism works. Coup 53 is almost as concerned with the film-making process – the lists, the dead ends, the searching – as much as it is with political history."

Making Coup 53 The New York Times Critic's Pick critics Ben Kenigsberg said: "It takes a certain kind of documentary to make sifting through old papers look exciting, but in Coup 53, the director Taghi Amirani sets an expectation of suspense early on. Across time and space, a single, consistent story emerges. For a narrative shrouded in subterfuge, that's a considerable achievement. Both as a detective story and as a deep dive into a world event whose consequences linger, it is bracing, absorbing filmmaking."

=== Comparison to John le Carré's work ===
Larushka Ivan-Zadeh in The Times gave the film 5 stars and said "Ralph Fiennes appears, lending a wry le Carré air to proceedings as an enigmatic MI6 agent with an explosive testimony. The sheer level of granular detail could overwhelm without Amirani's boundless to-camera energy. He transforms sifting through dusty plastic bags and filing cabinets into a thrilling detective case." Danny Leigh's review in The Financial Times said "This is not some dry piece of historical revision. Amirani's passion is palpable from the start and he peppers his film with twists and reveals that would make John le Carré smile." "It's like taking a swim in John le Carré's brain" said Dave Calhoun in his Time Out review titled "Shadowy spies and questing journalists abound in this taut, compelling doc". Marc Savlov in The Austin Chronicle wrote "Coup 53 is a historical documentary that plays more like All the President's Men had it been written by John le Carré with a dash of Costa-Gavras and Manchurian Candidate by John Frankenheimer." Savlov went on to say "a spellbinding rabbit-hole of a movie, rife with outsized characters and conspiracies galore, but also and perhaps, more importantly, an eye-opening window onto the U.S. and Iran's current state of mutual enmity."

=== Awards ===
Coup 53 won the Audience Award for Most Popular International Documentary at the Vancouver International Film Festival. The film received a nomination for Best Documentary, in the British Independent Film Awards. Coup 53 was nominated for the Grierson Award for Best Feature Documentary at the 2019 BFI London Film Festival. The film won Best Documentary at the MIFF Awards in Italy in December 2020. The film won the Audience Award at the 14th edition of Cinéma Vérité Festival in Iran in December 2020. The film won the Crystal Phoenix Award for best documentary at the 39th Fajr Film Festival in Iran in February 2021. Walter Murch's editing won the Best Edited Documentary award at the United Nations Association Film Festival in October 2021.

== Controversy ==
In August 2020, before the film's digital release, a controversy arose around a key claim in Coup 53 concerning MI6 spy Norman Darbyshire. Granada TV producers publicly challenged a claim reported in The Observer on August 2, 2020, that an interview with Darbyshire had been filmed for End of Empire - Iran but subsequently removed from the programme under pressure from the UK government

In a letter to The Observer on August 16, producer Mark Anderson and researcher Alison Rooper stated that Darbyshire had refused to be filmed and that the interview transcript quoted in Coup 53 was an off the record research interview

Their letter pointed out that in 1985 an article published in The Observer the day before End of Empire - Iran was due to be broadcast on Channel 4 confirmed this. It stated that the MI6 agent did not appear in the Granada programme "as he declined to be filmed to protect his anonymity".

On August 18, more doubts emerged over Coup 53's censorship claims when Correspondent World suggested one of the film's key interviewees was now unsure about his testimony.

The day after Coup 53's virtual release on August 19, 2020, through 118 theatres in the UK, US, Canada, and Ireland using the video-on-demand (VOD) platform Eventive. The film received over forty 100% positive reviews from the mainstream press including Washington Post, The Telegraph, New York Times, Wall Street Journal, NPR, The New Yorker, The Financial Times, The Guardian, etc. Excerpts of these were posted on Coup 53's official website with links to the original full reviews. The day after Coup 53's virtual release, End of Empire producers Norma Percy, Mark Anderson, and Alison Rooper issued a 13-point press release which was published on the website Correspondent World outlining how Coup 53 misinterprets the evidence and accusing Coup 53 of using clever editing to "wrap the coup story around a false narrative....calling into question our professional integrity." The press release pointed out that Coup 53's film makers had failed to show them a cut of the film after its completion in 2019 despite several requests, adding that "If they had done so we would have provided them with the evidence that Darbyshire never agreed to be filmed; that the cameraman is misremembering the identity of the official who spoke very openly; that Mossadegh’s grandson is muddling Darbyshire with Sam Falle; and that Granada TV itself shared the Darbyshire interview with The Observer as pre publicity for our programme." The press release was followed by a written request to Amirani from End of Empire producers, including renowned executive producer Brian Lapping, urging him to re-edit his film to remove "untrue claims that we were and still are party to a coverup/censorship in a broadcast documentary."

=== Denial of Access to Archive and Demand for Changes to Coup 53 ===
On 14 September 2020, ITV archive, who had inherited the archive of the End of Empire series, refused to extend the use, previously granted, of fourteen minutes of archive footage used in Coup 53. The reason given was that the use of the relevant archive material damaged the reputation of Granada TV, the producing entity. As a result, Amirani and Murch had to pull their film from distribution after a month to avoid copyright infringement. In an email to the 118 partner cinemas Amirani said "I have some sad news. Due to an archive licensing issue that has been brought to our attention today, we must withdraw the film from all public screenings until the issue is resolved with the copyright holder."

The next day on 15 September 2020, the producers of End of Empire sent Murch and Amirani twelve pages of redactions to be made in Coup 53, implying that if these changes were made, they would drop the threat of a lawsuit.

End of Empire - Iran producers state that Norman Darbyshire would not agree to go on the record, to be filmed or named, despite the clear recollections in three separate interviews over a four-month period with End of Empire's cameraman Humphry Trevelyan; and that Darbyshire therefore never appeared in any version of End of Empire - Iran despite the recollections of historical adviser Hedayat Matine-Daftary, who said that Darbyshire's testimony was in an early version of the film, but was removed "because the British Government had not allowed him to do it." End of Empire - Iran producers claim that the "off-the record" audio-only research interview Alison Rooper conducted with Darbyshire was important to their work in which they clearly show MI6's role in the coup. They deny that the British Government forced them to remove Darbyshire's testimony from the programme.

Murch however has stated in several interviews that no MI6 agent, speaking off-the-record in a deep-throat manner, would allow himself to be recorded, and that therefore it is likely that at the time of recording Darbyshire was speaking freely on-the-record. Murch says: "If an agent allows a recording to be made, he is by definition on the record."

End of Empire's suggested redactions in their 12-page document included removing all of cameraman Trevelyan's three interviews, all of adviser Matine-Daftary's interviews, all of journalist Nigel Hawkes's interview, and large sections of the interviews with End of Empire researcher Alison Rooper and author Stephen Dorril. Amirani and Murch refused to make these changes.

=== Legal Wrangling and Fair Use ===
Three months of legal activity followed, with Amirani and Murch exploring the avenue of Fair Use of those fourteen minutes. In November 2020, The Observer reported that Baroness Helena Kennedy had been asked to mediate between the Coup 53 filmmakers and the End of Empire program-makers, but the negotiations had broken down. Amirani and Murch told The Observer that they faced "a painful choice between a long legal battle or making expensive changes to important elements of their film" in order to regain the right to license footage from End of Empire - Iran. They chose the legal route by engaging some of the UK's top media lawyers. During this period End of Empire did not instruct solicitors and did not issue any formal legal notice against Amirani and Murch. In late November 2020 Matrix Chambers and the law firm Carter-Ruck acting on behalf of Amirani and Murch sent ITV Archive opinion letters showing that the threat of End of Empire's lawsuit had no legal merit. On December 14, ITV Archive reissued the original license giving access to the disputed archive. Amirani and Murch also agreed to include text and voice-over stating the "categorical" position of End of Empire that Darbyshire was never filmed, and that Humphry Trevelyan, having met with the producers of End of Empire in September 2020, claimed to be the victim of false memory and that he mistook Samuel Falle for Norman Darbyshire.

=== Coup 53 Returns to Distribution ===
Coup 53 went back into VOD distribution on December 18, 2020, where it is available worldwide through Vimeo on Demand and Coup 53's official website.

Without a studio or distributor backing, Coup 53 went on to qualify for the BAFTA in six categories including Outstanding Debut by a British Director, Best Documentary and Best Editing. It also qualified for American Academy Awards in three categories, including Editing, Best Feature Documentary and Best Picture.

In response, the producers of End of Empire - Iran produced a website and video to summarize their critiques, addressing BAFTA members not to vote for Coup 53. They challenge the suggestions made by one of the interviewees (Hedayat Matine-Daftary) that they censored the key interview with MI6 agent Norman Darbyshire to downplay MI6's role in the coup.

The End of Empire - Iran production team and other website contributors object to Coup 53's suggestions that the Darbyshire transcript was "leaked" to The Observer journalist Nigel Hawkes or "discovered" by the makers of Coup 53, as the End of Empire - Iran producers in fact openly shared the transcript and all other evidence with both Hawkes in 1985 and with Amirani in 2014. However, the Darbyshire transcript found by Coup 53 was given to Amirani by Hedayat Matine-Daftary, the historic advisor on End of Empire – Iran. The cut-up transcript is unique because it is the only original document with Darbyshire's name typed on it, including handwritten notes by the End of Empire production team. A note on page one seen at 17 minutes 38 seconds into the film says: "Excellent - if we want the coup in detail - & even if not!".

Amirani and Murch point out that in 1985 Darbyshire was still alive, and because then, as now, the British Government has still not admitted involvement in the Coup of 1953, this leaking of the memo was highly dangerous, since in the memo Darbyshire, though unnamed, admits to involvement in the kidnapping, torture, and murder of an Iranian general (Mahmoud Afshartous). In a cover letter from Hawkes to Stephen Dorril, dated September 7, 1985, Hawkes writes that "I've no doubt we can work it out." This is seen in "Coup 53" at 51 minutes 41 seconds.

Website contributors also claim that the film gives insufficient credit for extensively using End of Empire – Iran footage and for its pioneering research uncovering British involvement in the coup. However, in Coup 53, Murch can be seen and heard praising Alison Rooper for the depth of her research. She is clearly captioned as Alison Rooper – Researcher End of Empire at 23 minutes and 52 seconds in the film. In addition, there are at least eleven on-screen references to End of Empire in Coup 53 and a credit to ITV Archive as stipulated in their own license agreement.

=== Veracity of Darbyshire Transcript ===
The veracity of the audio transcript with Norman Darbyshire is not in dispute. End of Empire researcher Alison Rooper has stated in her 16 August 2020 letter to The Observer that the transcript is an accurate record of the Darbyshire interview. Later, Alison Rooper states that the transcript can be seen online at The National Security Archive website

On 17 August 2020, two days before the release Julian Borger of The Guardian wrote on article based on the release of the Darbyshire transcript by the producers of Coup 53 to The National Security Archive

=== Subsequent Retractions of Testimony ===
Several contributors to Coup 53 have criticized the film and its use of their contributions. Cameraperson Humphry Trevelyan has retracted his statements in the film, saying that upon meeting with the End of Empire producers, a year after the film's European premiere at the London Film Festival, reviewing his memories and evidence, he has "had to reach the conclusion that my memory of my involvement in a filmed interview with Darbyshire was erroneous". Trevelyan states that he filmed only one interview for the Iran episode at The Savoy Hotel, which was with Sir Sam Falle. Murch and Amirani point out that Trevelyan also filmed Sir Evelyn Shuckburgh for the Iran episode at the Savoy Hotel (Slates 19–21 on 15 February 1983).

The Shuckburgh interview was not used in the Iran episode of End of Empire, but the transcript of his interview plus production notes can be seen in the End of Empire collection kept at the Bodleian Libraries in Oxford

Author Stephen Dorril, who is interviewed in Coup 53, has called the film "essentially fraudulent" for its suggestions that it has uncovered suppressed information about Darbyshire, noting that he has discussed Darbyshire in print since 1989, and suggesting Amirani misled Dorril about evidence of a filmed interview with Darbyshire. Author and End of Empire researcher Cate Haste asked to be removed from Coup 53's credits.

=== Support for Coup 53 from Filmmaking Community and Others ===
In his book Winston Churchill: His Times, His Crimes author Tariq Ali includes a section about the 1953 coup in Iran which was signed off by Winston Churchill. In writing about this story Tariq Ali devotes pages 379–380 to Coup 53 and its battles with End of Empire. His conclusion is "The secretiveness of Ml6 is not a secret, and whatever happened then or since has their pawprint on it."

In a post screening Q&A on 23 September 2022 at the Irish Film Institute Documentary Festival Taghi Amirani said that "the attacks by End of Empire on Coup 53 had not only made the film stronger but attracted the support of some of the most distinguished and respected filmmakers in the world including Michael Moore, Errol Morris, Chris Terrio, Paul Hirsch, Mike Leigh, Werner Herzog, Oliver Stone and David Puttnam.
