= The Cat and the Coup =

2011 video game

- Developers: Peter Brinson; Kurosh ValaNejad
- Platform: Windows
- Release: 2011
- Genre: Puzzle
- Mode: Single-player

The Cat and the Coup is a puzzle video game by Peter Brinson and Kurosh ValaNejad. The game follows the life of Prime Minister of Iran, Mohammad Mosaddegh, and his subsequent downfall through a CIA and MI6 engineered coup in 1953. On June 15, 2011, the game was released on Steam.

The game's opening puzzle

== Development and release ==
The Cat and the Coup was developed over a three-year period and was funded in part by The Advancing Scholarship for the Humanities and Social Sciences, and the Game Innovation Lab at the University of Southern California. Over the course of its development, it received multiple awards, including IndieCade's documentary game award; it was a finalist for the Nuovo award at the Independent Games Festival and Runner Up for the Knight News Game award at Games for Change.

The Cat and the Coup is considered an example of "eccentric history" by Steve F. Anderson in his book Technologies of History: Film, Television and the Eccentricity of the Past (Dartmouth 2011), which features an image from the game on its cover. He writes, “What makes The Cat and the Coup exemplary from a historiographical perspective is its striking adherence to, and departures from, the historical record." The game is noted for "using factually grounded sources such as New York Times headlines," while also positioning players in the imaginary role of Mosaddegh's cat, whose inability to control the course of history serves as "a metaphor for the uncertainty of historical outcomes."
