= Taghi Amirani =

Iranian-born British nuclear physicist and filmmaker

External videos
- 70 years after Iranian coup, the British still won’t confess to their crimes on YouTube

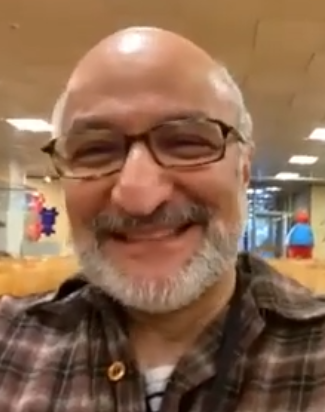
Taghi Amirani 2020

Taghi Amirani is an Iranian-born English physicist and documentary filmmaker who lives in the United Kingdom. He has worked primarily in television, prior to the release of the film documentary Coup 53 in 2019.

== Early life and education ==
Taghi Amirani grew up in Iran.

In 1975 he moved to England to attend school. He went on to study physics at the University of Nottingham. His final year project at University of Nottingham was Shades of Black, a documentary about the experience of entering a black hole.

He took a postgraduate film and television course at the University of Bristol, where he made Mechanics of Love, a black-and-white silent comedy film.

== Career ==
=== Early television work ===
His first job after leaving the University of Bristol was at Thames TV, where he worked as a researcher on documentaries. In 1989 he made his debut as a producer and director with an episode of Channel 4's Equinox series entitled "Earth Calling Basingstoke". He went on to make several dozen 36 full-length films, in addition to a number of short films and commercials.

In addition to Equinox, he has written, directed, and/or produced episodes of the series True Stories, He Play, Q.E.D., Short Stories, Auction, The Jupiter Collision, Holy Places, Encounters, Picture This, Edinburgh or Bust, Correspondent, War on Iraq, This Time Next Year, and Wide Angle. He also made the six-part series Mad about Machines, about the relationship between people and their machines. He was field producer and cinematographer for the 2003 TV documentary Inside Mecca, a National Geographic production that followed three pilgrims to Mecca from different parts of the world.

=== The Dispossessed ===
After the U.S. began its invasion of Afghanistan in November 2001, Amirani went to that country and interviewed ordinary Afghans at a Taliban-run refugee camp. The result was The Dispossessed, which was aired in January 2002 as an episode of the BBC series Correspondent. When criticized for showing some scenes of suffering, he said in his defense that “we have a choice of switching off to other people's suffering and getting on with our lives or getting involved and seeing what our governments are doing in our name. It is our job to convey that information – to bring the suffering of these people who are caught between many evils. They were oppressed by the Taliban, before that they were invaded by the Russians, they've gone through years of war and now they are being bombed by the Americans.”

=== Red Lines and Deadlines ===
Amirani has explained that since he was not in Iran during the 1979 revolution, he “always felt I had missed the first-hand experience of an important chapter in my country’s history. Instead, from my adopted home in England, I watched the revolution and the ensuing 26 years unfold on TV.” Over the years he came to feel that “what I was watching were developments in my homeland interpreted through the prism of mainly Western journalists and filmmakers. It was time to stop watching the stream of stereotype and customary clichés from the outside, and go find out for myself.” In 2004 he went to Iran “to look for stories” and saw a copy of Shargh, a reformist newspaper. He ended up writing, producing, directing, and photographing a 2004 documentary, Red Lines and Deadlines, about the staff of the newspaper and its reformist politics. It was first aired on PBS as part of the series Wide Angle. The Wall Street Journal described the film as “an unprecedented look into the Orwellian world of Iranian journalism.”

=== Coup 53 ===
He wrote, produced, directed, and photographed the documentary Coup 53, which was released in 2019. The film recounts Operation Ajax, the 1953 coup in Iran engineered by the CIA and MI6 to overthrow the Prime Minister Mohammad Mossadegh. He visited the National Security Archive at George Washington University in order to make a portion of the film. This film was co-produced by Ahmad Kiarostami and co-written and edited by Walter Murch.

=== Other professional activities ===
Taghi Amirani has served as a jury member at the International Emmys, Royal Television Society, One World Media Awards, and Sheffield International Documentary Festival. He was awarded a TED Fellowship in 2009, and the next year received a TED Senior Fellowship in 2010. In a 2014 TEDx Talk he spoke about the importance of “embracing uncertainty.”

== Personal life ==
Amirani lives in London. He ran the New York Marathon in 2006 and 2010.
