= Ashraf Pahlavi =

Iranian princess (1919–2016)

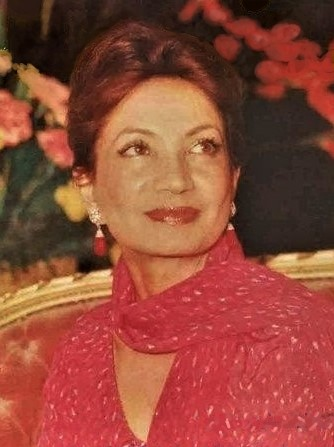
- Pahlavi, c. 1974
- Born: Zahra Pahlavi; 26 October 1919; Tehran, Sublime State of Iran
- Died: 7 January 2016 (aged 96); Monte Carlo, Monaco
- Burial: 14 January 2016; Monaco Cemetery
- Spouse: Ali Ghavam (m. 1937; div. 1942) Ahmad Shafiq (m. 1944; div. 1960) Mehdi Bushehri (m. 1960)
- Issue: Shahram Pahlavi-Nia; Shahriar Shafiq; Azadeh Shafiq
Names
- English: Ashraf ol-Molouk; Persian: اشرف‌الملوک
- House: Pahlavi
- Father: Reza Shah
- Mother: Tadj ol-Molouk

Ashraf ol-Molouk Pahlavi (Persian: اشرف‌الملوک پهلوی, Ašraf Pahlavi, 26 October 1919 – 7 January 2016) was the twin sister of Mohammad Reza Pahlavi, the late Shah of Iran (Persia), and a member of the Pahlavi dynasty. She was considered the "power behind her brother" and was instrumental in the 1953 countercoup that overthrew Prime Minister Mohammad Mosaddegh in favour of strengthening the monarchical rule of the Shah. She served her brother as a palace adviser and was a strong advocate for women's rights. Following the Iranian Revolution in 1979, she lived in exile in France, New York, Paris and Monte Carlo and remained outspoken against the Iranian Islamic Republic.

== Early life ==
Ashraf Pahlavi was born in Tehran, Iran, on 26 October 1919, five hours after her brother Mohammad Reza. Her parents were Reza Pahlavi, a military commander, who would become the Shah of Iran, and Tadj ol-Molouk, the second of his four wives. She had 10 siblings and half-siblings.

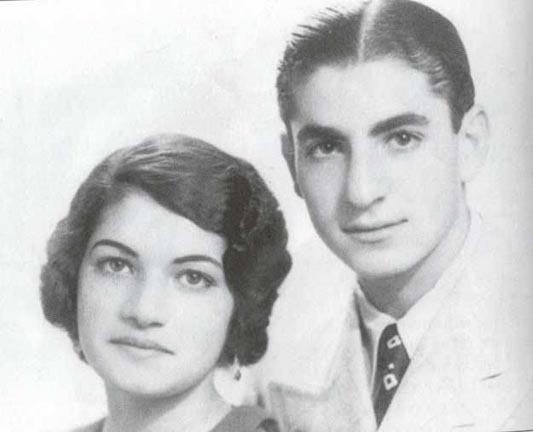
Ashraf with her twin brother, Shah Mohammad Reza Pahlavi, 1940s

In the early 1930s, Ashraf Pahlavi, her older sister Shams, and their mother, were among the first significant Iranian women to cease wearing the traditional veil. On 8 January 1936, she and her mother and sister played a major symbolic role in the Kashf-e hijab (the abolition of the veil), which was a part of the shah's effort to include women in public society, by participating in the graduation ceremony of Tehran Teacher's College unveiled.

In 1932, she hosted the Second Eastern Women's Congress, which was arranged by the Jam'iyat-e Nesvan-e Vatankhah.

Ashraf Pahlavi was not permitted to attend university, and instead was married in 1937, at the age of 18, to Mirza Khan Ghavam, whose family was politically allied with her father.

== Politics ==
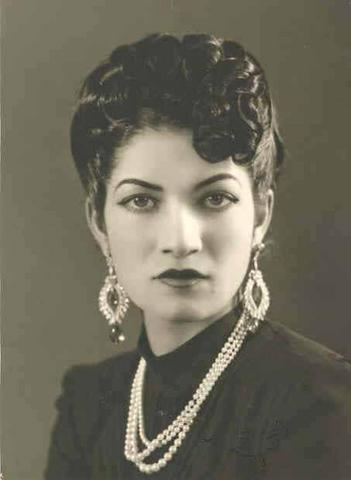
Ashraf Pahlavi in her youth

=== 1953 coup ===
In 1953, Ashraf Pahlavi played an important role in Operation Ajax as the one who changed Mohammad Reza Shah's mind in giving consent to the CIA and SIS to start the operation. The Shah had originally opposed the operation and for a while resisted accepting it. In early 1953, she met with CIA agents who asked her to talk to her brother since she was the only one who was able to influence him. As historian Stephen Kinzer's book All the Shah's Men recounts, "Ashraf was enjoying life in French casinos and nightclubs when one of Kermit Roosevelt's best Iranian agents, Assadollah Rashidian, paid her a call. He found her reluctant, so the next day a delegation of American and British agents came to pose the invitation in stronger terms. The leader of the delegation, a senior British operative named Norman Darbyshire, had the foresight to bring a mink coat and a packet of cash. When Ashraf saw these emoluments, Darbyshire later recalled, "her eyes lit up and her resistance crumbled". By her own account, Pahlavi was offered a blank check if she agreed to return to Iran from her enforced exile in France, but refused the money and returned it of her own accord.

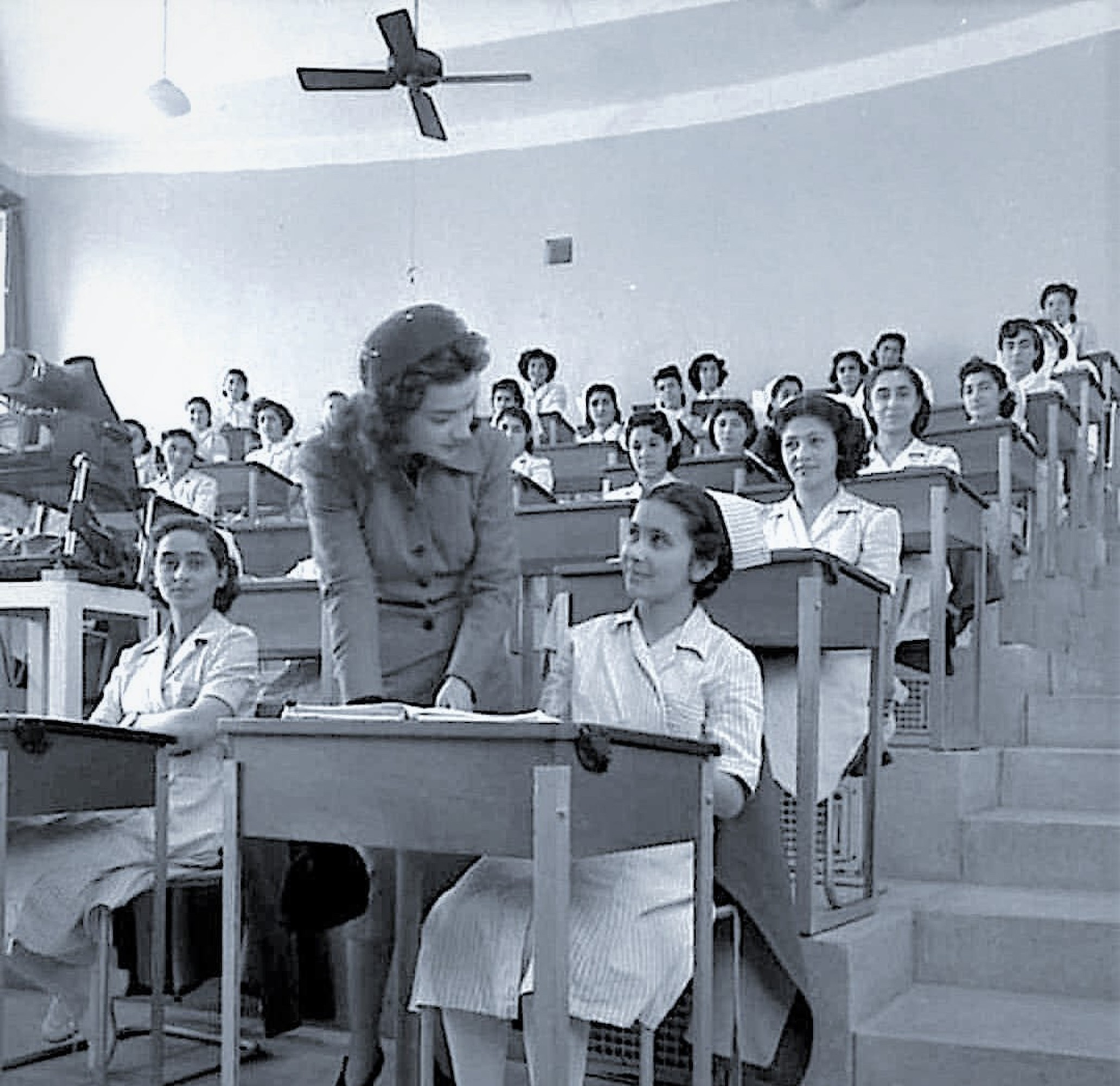
Ashraf Pahlavi and student nurses, 1960

Some historians argue that the coup would have occurred with or without Ashraf Pahlavi's persuasion of her brother. In an International Journal of Middle East Studies article, writer Mark Gasiorowski states that the Shah "was not consulted about the decision to undertake the coup, about its manner of execution, or about the candidate chosen to replace Mosaddegh" and that the coup was instead largely executed by the United States and others looking to undermine Mosaddegh's leadership.

=== Political activities ===
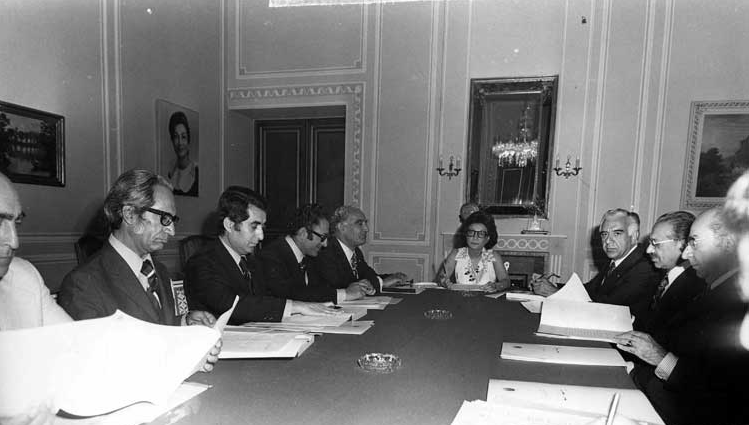
Ashraf Pahlavi heading a meeting

Ashraf Pahlavi was a strong supporter of women's rights in Iran and the world during her brother's reign. In 1967, Pahlavi worked with the United Nations as the Iranian delegate to the Commission on Human Rights as well as the Economic and Social Council. In 1975, she was heavily involved with the International Women's Year, and addressed the United Nations.

Though an instrumental force in legitimising gender reforms, her philosophy on gender was not particularly introspective: "I confess that even though since childhood I had paid a price for being a woman, in terms of education and personal freedom, I had not given much thought to specific ways in which women in general were more oppressed than men". By her own account, she was a strong supporter of the rights of women to basic life necessities such as "food, education, and health" and was not a radical reformist. She cited "chronic apathy" from many governments as the underlying issue that prevented women's rights reforms from being implemented around the world.

Ashraf Pahlavi's women's rights stance was called into question after the publication of her 1976 New York Times op-ed piece, "And Thus Passeth International Women's Year." In a March 1976 article in The Nation, writer Kay Boyle criticized Ashraf for her touting of International Women's Year as succeeding in widening the global vision of sisterhood, while approximately 4,000 of the Princess's own "sisters" were political prisoners in Iran with virtually no hope of a military trial.

In her 1980 memoirs, Pahlavi acknowledges the poor conditions of women in Iran and expresses concern, as she writes, "the news of what was happening to Iran's women was extremely painful... [they] were segregated and relegated to second-class status... many were imprisoned or exiled".

Additionally, Pahlavi worked as an activist for human rights and equality. She was an advocate for the international spread of literacy, especially in Iran, where her brother Mohammad Reza Shah was a major proponent of the anti-illiteracy movement. She served as a member on the International Consultative Liaison Committee for Literacy.

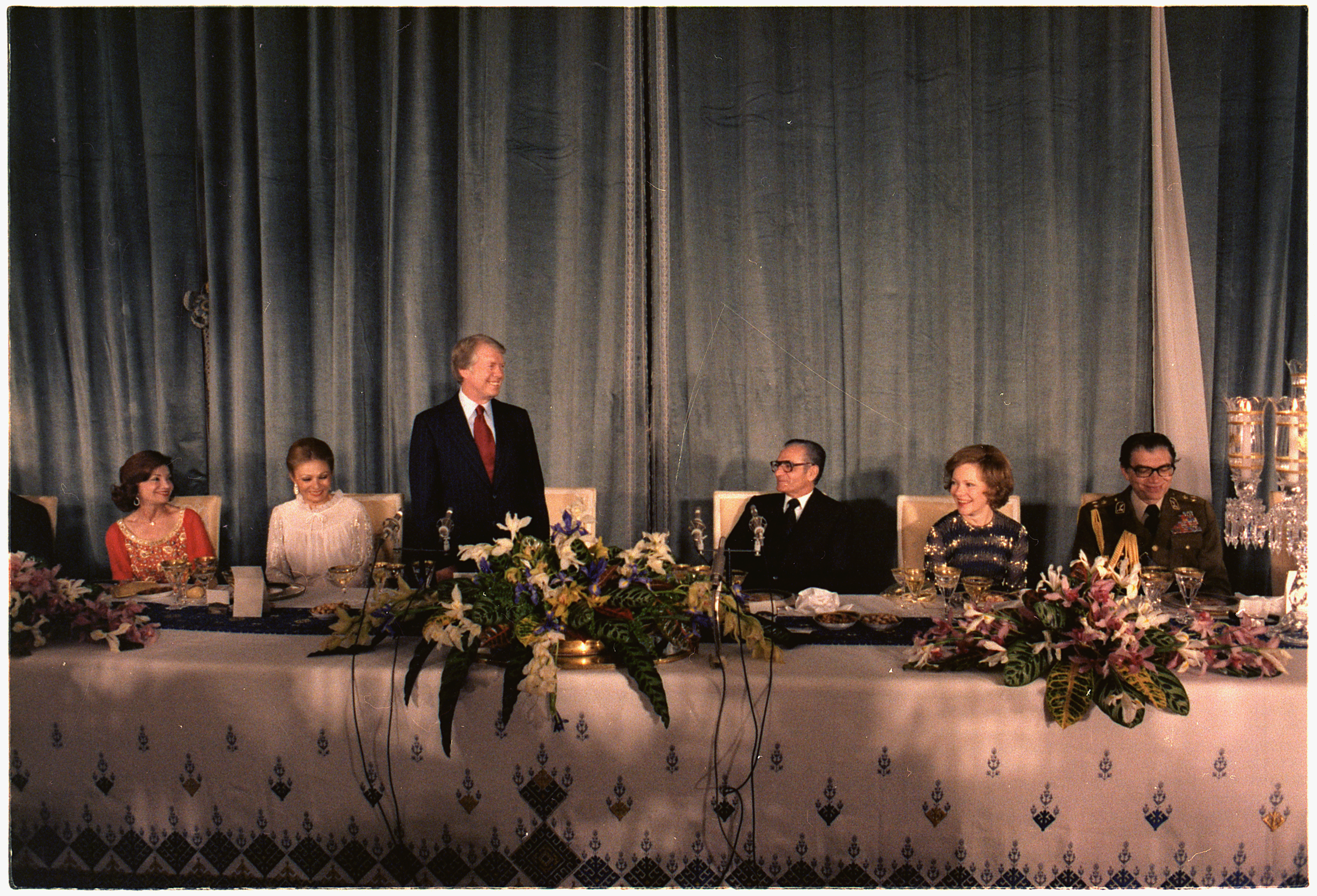
Ashraf (far left) along with other imperial family members, at a dinner with U.S. President Jimmy Carter in Niavaran Palace in 1977.

Ashraf Pahlavi was the target of an unsuccessful assassination attempt in the summer of 1977 at her summer home on the French Riviera. The attack took place early in the morning as the princess was returning from the Palm Beach Casino in Cannes to her villa in Juan-les-Pins (35 Bd Edouard Baudoin). Fourteen bullets were fired into the side of her Rolls-Royce. Her lady-in-waiting was killed, and her chauffeur injured, but the princess left the scene unharmed.

After the 1979 Islamic Revolution, Ashraf Pahlavi asked David Rockefeller to support her brother Mohammad Reza's attempts to find asylum.

She also attacked U.S. President Jimmy Carter and the United Nations Secretary General Kurt Waldheim for not giving their support to her late brother, the Shah, during the beginnings of the revolution. In 1994, she attended the funeral of former president Richard Nixon.

== Character and finance ==
Ashraf Pahlavi argued that she was "attacked for financial misconduct" because she was engaged "in the administration of various organizations". By her own account, she was of limited financial means when Mosaddegh sent her into exile in Paris. However, in later years she was said to have accumulated a large fortune. She attributed her wealth to increases in the value of lands that she had inherited from her father Reza Shah, and income from inherited businesses. Nevertheless, it has been purported that part of the story behind the build up of her fortune may have been that during the Iranian industrial boom, which was driven by a surge in oil prices, Pahlavi and her son Shahram took 10% or more of a new company's stock gratis in return for ensuring the delivery of a license to operate, to import, to export, or to deal with the government. Government licenses were said to be given only to a few well-connected companies in each field. As a result, the need to get and keep a license became a cost that had to be met.

In 1979, The New York Times reported that a document dated 17 September 1978 from Ashraf's office requested a transfer of $708,000 from her Bank Melli account to her account at the Union Bank of Switzerland in Geneva under the code name 'SAIPA', which, in French, her preferred foreign language, stands for: S-on, A-ltesse, I-mperiale, P-rincesse, A-shraf.

In 1980, Pahlavi wrote an article for The New York Times, in which she came out in defense of herself and her family's financial situation. In the article, she argued that her wealth was not accumulated through "ill-gotten gains" and attributed her fortune to inherited land, which "drastically increased in value with the development of Iran and the new prosperity that was there for all". She asserted that many other Iranians profited from the sale of their own real estate, but were not accused of financial misconduct because of close ties to the clergy and Ayatollah Khomeini. She also defended her brother, Mohammad Reza Pahlavi, stating that, contrary to the claims made by some Khomeini supporters, the Shah did not profit from the Pahlavi Foundation. The Princess wrote that she planned to "fight these slanders with all my means and through whatever judicial means are available".

Psychologically, Ashraf Pahlavi had low self-esteem when she was younger. She did not like "what she saw in the mirror." She "wished for someone else's face,..., fairer skin, and more height." She always imagined that "there were so few people in this world shorter than I." Perhaps this motivated her to be bold. In her memoirs she wrote:

Two decades ago French journalists named me "La Panthère Noire" (The Black Panther), I must admit that I rather like this name, and that in some respects it suits me. Like the panther, my nature is turbulent, rebellious, self-confident. Often, it is only through strenuous effort that I maintain my reserve and my composure in public. But in truth, I sometimes wish I were armed with the panther's claws so that I might attack the enemies of my country.

Her brother, Mohammad Reza Shah, was her closest friend. In her memoirs, she remembers looking upon him with a sense of wonder as a child, writing, "long before we reached adulthood, his voice became the dominant one in my life."

Some sources mention a connection between her and drug trafficking; she said: "My detractors have accused me of being a smuggler, a spy, a Mafia associate (once even a drug dealer)".

== Notable positions held ==
- Honorary President of Red Lion and Sun Society, 1944
- Chairwoman of the United Nations Commission on the Status of Women, 1965
- Iranian delegate to the United Nations Commission on Human Rights, 1967
- Iranian delegate to the United Nations Economic and Social Council, 1967
- Chairwoman of the United Nations High Commission for Human Rights, 1970
- Member of the Consultative Committee of International Women's Year Conference, 1975
- President of the Women's Organization of Iran, 1967–1979
- Chairwoman of the Imperial Foundation for Social Services
- Honorary Fellow of Wadham College, Oxford
- Member of the International Consultative Liaison Committee for Literacy

== Marriages and children ==
=== First marriage ===
Pahlavi's first marriage was to Mirza 'Ali Muhammed Khan Ghavam, Nasir ud-Daula (1911–?). They were married in March 1937 and divorced in 1942. Ghavam was the Assistant Military Attaché for Iran in 1941 in Washington, DC, and the eldest son of Mirza Ibrahim Khan Ghavam, Qavam ul-Mulk. She had one son from her first marriage, Prince (Vala Gohar) Shahram Pahlavi-Nia (born 18 April 1940, Tehran). In 1966 he married 16-year-old Niloufar Afshar, and the couple had one son, Cyrus, in 1969. Pahlavi-Nia had another son, Amir Ebrahim (born 1974) out of wedlock with Naz Alam, a daughter of the Shah's longtime minister of court and confidante, Asadollah Alam. In 1987 Shahram and Naz had an Islamic marriage ceremony in the US Virgin Islands.

=== Second marriage ===
Ashraf and her spouse, Ahmed Shafiq

Pavlavi's second marriage was to (Sahib ul-Izza) Ahmed Chafik Bey (21 September 1911 – 1976). He was the director-general of Civil Aviation and fourth son of (Hazrat Sahib ul-Sa'ada) Ahmad Shafiq Pasha, the minister of the Khedivial Court of Egypt. They married in 1944 in Cairo, and divorced in 1960; he went on to a second marriage to Deloris Pianezzola, and died of cancer in 1976, in Tehran. They had two children, Captain Prince (Vala Gohar) Shahriar Mustapha Chafik (15 March 1945 – 7 December 1979), assassinated in Paris, and Princess (Vala Gohari) Azadeh Pahlavi-Chafik (1951–2011).

=== Third marriage ===
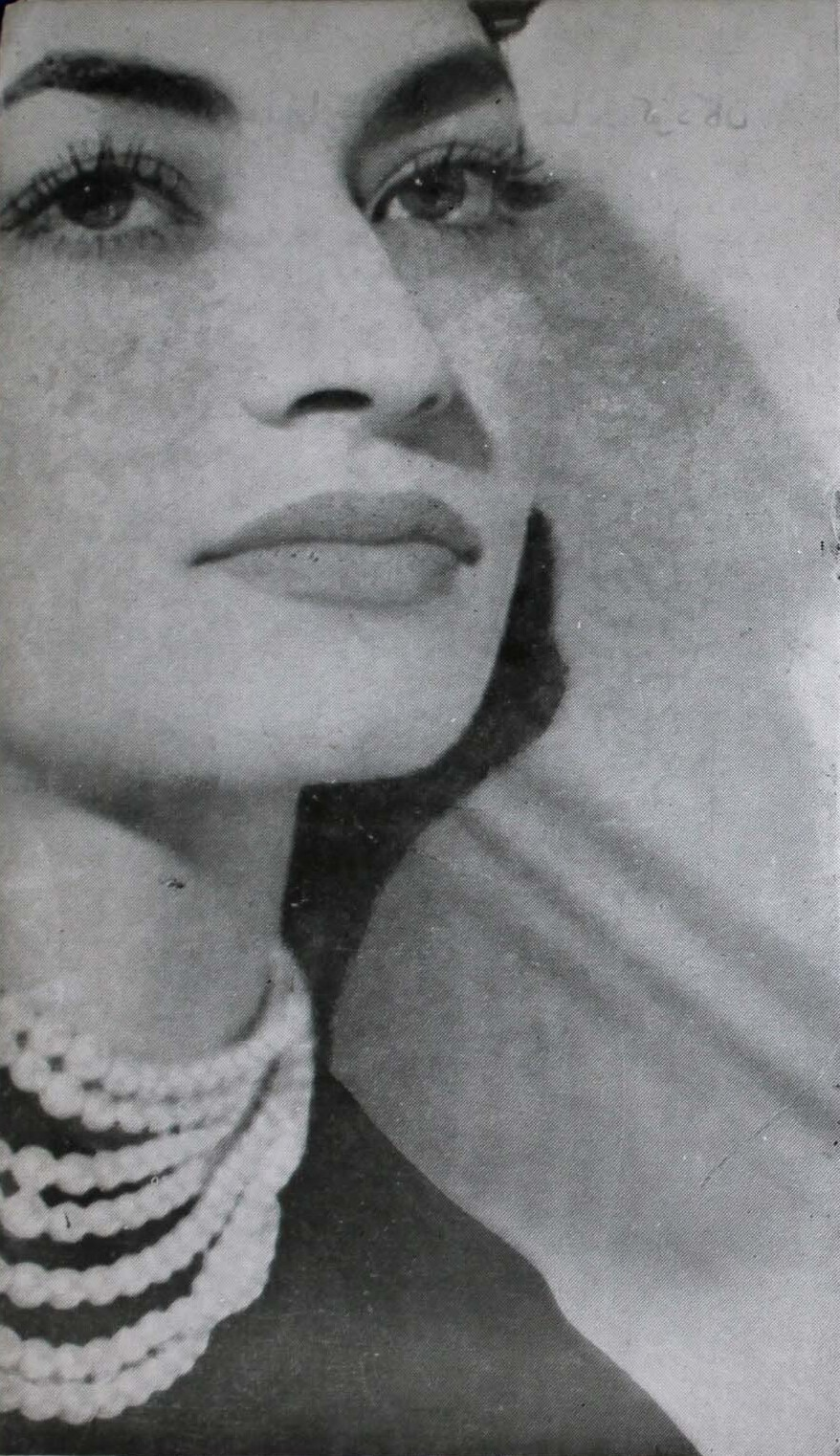
Ashraf Pahlavi, 1964

Pahlavi married a third and final time on 5 June 1960 (at the Iranian Embassy in Paris) to Mehdi Bushehri (1916–?), who was the director of the Maison d'Iran (House of Iran), Paris. He was a nephew of Javad Bushehri, a politician. Pahlavi and Mehdi Bushehri had no children together, and were often separated while Pahlavi lived in exile in New York City and Mehdi Bushehri remained in Paris.

In a 1980 interview with The New York Times journalist Judy Lee Klemesrud, Pahlavi stated, "I have never been a good mother. Because of my way of life, I was not with my children very much".

== Exile and death ==
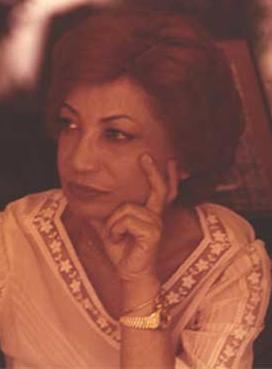
Ashraf in the 1970s

After the Revolution Princess Ashraf divided her time between Beekman Place 29, which she sold before moving to Park Avenue, in New York City (Beekman Place 29 and 31), Paris and in Juan-les-Pins (35 Bd Edouard Baudoin), on the French Riviera.

One of Princess Ashraf's last public appearances was in 2001 at the Christian memorial service for Princess Soraya in Paris.

Princess Ashraf Pahlavi died on 7 January 2016 in Monte Carlo at the age of 96. She had suffered from Alzheimer's disease. Her death was announced by her nephew and the imperial family's head, Reza Pahlavi on his Facebook page.

Robert F. Armao, an adviser, said the cause was "old age". Armao related that Princess Ashraf died in her sleep at home in Europe, but declined to name the country, citing concern for the safety of her family.

Her funeral took place on 14 January 2016 in the Cimetière de Monaco in Monaco, attended by members of the Pahlavi family, including Empress Farah Pahlavi. She left behind one surviving child (two other children had already died before her) and four grandchildren.

At the time of her death, she was the oldest living member of her family.

== Books ==
Ashraf Pahlavi wrote two books in English:

- Faces in a Mirror: Memoirs from Exile (1980)
- Time for Truth (1995)

Additionally, she wrote one book in French:

- Jamais Résignée (1981)

Her three books were published following her 1980 The New York Times article "I Will Fight These Slanders". In accordance with her promise to fight the "slanders" about her and her family, her books are largely concerned with clearing up what she viewed as misconceptions about the Pahlavi dynasty. She again addressed questions about her personal financial situation, writing in her most widely read book, her memoir Faces in a Mirror, "I had inherited about $300,000 when my father died (and about 1 million square meters of land near the Caspian Sea, as well as properties in Gorgan and Kermanshah, which would later become extremely valuable)." In the introduction to this book, Pahlavi writes that she wants "very much to explain to Western readers what they have failed to understand about the nature of Iran's culture and heritage...about the nature of the so-called Islamic revolution". Generally, her books are viewed as too autobiographical and steeped in emotion to be used as serious historical references: Library Journal called Pahlavi's Faces in a Mirror, "little more than a personalized homily on the Pahlavis' virtues and the perfidy of nearly everyone else in the world."

Before the 1979 revolution, Pahlavi translated several books from French into Persian, including books on nursing and child care.

== Honours ==
=== National dynastic ===
- House of Pahlavi: Member 1st Class of the Order of Aryamehr
- House of Pahlavi: Member 1st Class of the Order of the Pleiades

=== Foreign ===
- Ethiopian Imperial Family: Grand Cordon of the Order of the Queen of Sheba
- Germany: Grand Cross 1st Class of the Order of Merit of the Federal Republic of Germany
- Netherlands: Grand Cross of the Order of the House of Orange
- Order of the Red Banner of Labour (1946, Soviet Union)
- Honorary doctorate from the Brandeis University (1969, Waltham, Massachusetts, USA)

== See also ==
- List of Iranian women royalty

== Bibliography ==
- Fardust, Hussein (1998). The Rise and Fall of the Pahlavi Dynasty: Memoirs of Former General Hussein Fardust. Translated by Ali Akbar Dareini. Motilal Banarsidass. ISBN 8120816420.
- Gasiorowski, Mark (1987). "The 1953 coup d'etat in Iran". International Journal of Middle East Studies. 19 (3): 261–286. doi:10.1017/S0020743800056737. JSTOR 163655. S2CID 154201459.
- Hoveyda, Fereydoun (1979). The Fall of the Shah. New York: Wyndham Books.
- Keddie, Nikki, R. (1981). Roots of Revolution: an Interpretive History. New Haven, CT: Yale University Press. ISBN 9780300026115.
- Kinzer, Stephen (2003). All the Shah's Men: an American Coup and the Roots of Middle East Terror. John Wiley & Sons. ISBN 978-0-471-67878-6.
- Pahlavi, Ashraf (1980). Faces in a Mirror – Memoirs from Exile. Englewood Cliffs, NJ: Prentice Hall. ISBN 9780132991315.
