= Mohammad Mosaddegh =

Prime Minister of Iran from 1951 to 1953

- محمد مصدق
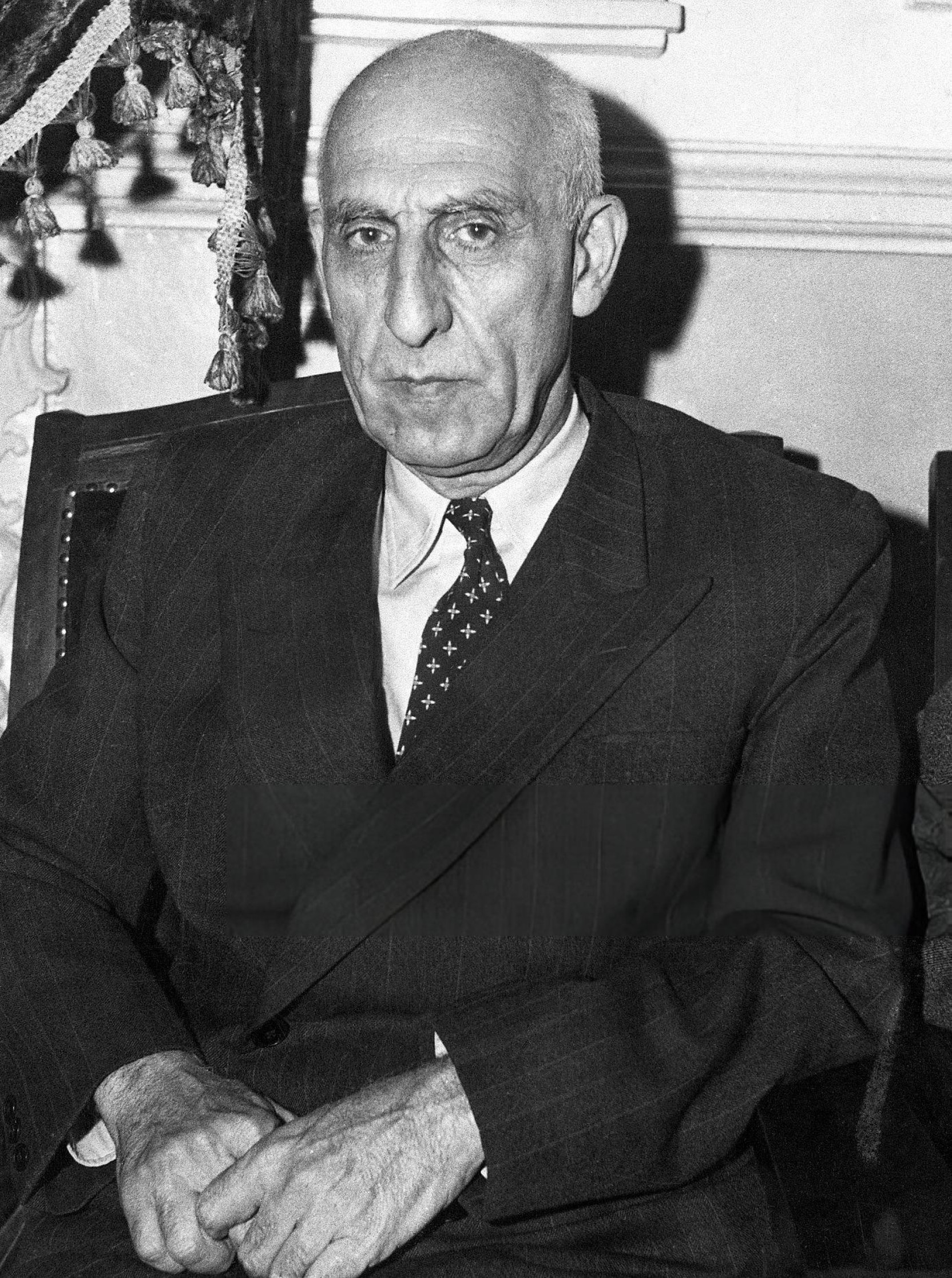
- Mosaddegh in 1951

Prime Minister of Iran
- In office 21 July 1952 – 19 August 1953
- Monarch: Mohammad Reza Pahlavi
- Preceded by: Ahmad Qavam
- Succeeded by: Fazlollah Zahedi
- In office 28 April 1951 – 16 July 1952
- Monarch: Mohammad Reza Pahlavi
- Preceded by: Hossein Ala'
- Succeeded by: Ahmad Qavam

Minister of National Defence
- In office 21 July 1952 – 19 August 1953
- Monarch: Mohammad Reza Pahlavi
- Prime Minister: Himself
- Preceded by: Morteza Yazdanpanah
- Succeeded by: Abdollah Hedayat

Minister of Foreign Affairs
- In office 30 May 1923 – 23 September 1923
- Monarch: Ahmad Shah Qajar
- Prime Minister: Hassan Pirnia
- Preceded by: Mohammad-Ali Foroughi
- Succeeded by: Mohammad-Ali Foroughi
- In office 30 September 1921 – 8 October 1921
- Monarch: Ahmad Shah Qajar
- Prime Minister: Ahmad Qavam
- Preceded by: Hassan Esfandiari
- Succeeded by: Assadollah Ghadimi

Vali of Azerbaijan Province
- In office 17 February 1922 – 12 July 1922
- Monarch: Ahmad Shah Qajar
- Prime Minister: Hassan Pirnia
- Succeeded by: Amanullah Jahanbani

Minister of Finance
- In office 21 November 1921 – 7 January 1922
- Monarch: Ahmad Shah Qajar
- Prime Minister: Ahmad Qavam

Vali of Fars province
- In office 11 October 1920 – 22 March 1921
- Monarch: Ahmad Shah Qajar
- Prime Minister: Hassan Pirnia

Member of the Parliament of Iran
- In office 25 April 1950 – 27 April 1951
- Constituency: Tehran
- Majority: 30,738 (ranked 1st)
- In office 7 March 1944 – 12 March 1946
- Constituency: Tehran
- Majority: Ranked 1st
- In office 11 July 1926 – 13 August 1928
- Constituency: Tehran
- In office 11 February 1924 – 11 February 1926
- Constituency: Tehran
- Majority: Ranked 3rd
- In office Unable to assume office in 1906
- Constituency: Isfahan Hasnain

Personal details
- Born: Mirza Mohammad-Khan Mossadegh-ol-Saltaneh; 16 June 1882 Tehran, Sublime State of Iran
- Died: 5 March 1967 (aged 84) Najmieh Hospital, Tehran, Imperial State of Iran
- Resting place: Ahmadabad-e Mosaddeq Castle
- Party: Moderate Socialists' Party (1914–1918); Anti-Reorganization Democrat (1918–1919); Independent (1919–1949); National Front (1949–1967)
- Spouse: Zahra Khanum (m. 1901; died 1965)
- Children: 5
- Parents: Mirza Hedayatollah (father); Najm al-Saltaneh (mother)
- Relatives: Abdol-Hossein Farman Farma (uncle); Abbas Mirza (great-grandfather)
- Education: University of Neuchâtel
- Mohammad Mosaddegh's voice Recorded in the National Consultative Assembly from the Library, Museum and Document Center of Iran Parliament

Mohammad Mosaddegh (Note: His surname is also spelt Mossadeq, Mosaddiq, Mossadegh, Mossaddeq, Mosadeck, or Musaddiq.) (Note: Persian: محمد مصدق, IPA: [mohæmˈmæd(-e) mosædˈdeɢ]; The -[e] is the Izāfa, which is a grammatical marker linking two words together. It is not indicated in writing, and is not part of the name itself, but is used when a first and last name are used together.) (16 June 1882 – 5 March 1967) was an Iranian politician, author and lawyer who served as the prime minister of Iran from 1951 to 1953, elected by the 16th Majlis. He was elected to the Iranian parliament in 1923 and served through a contentious 1952 election into the 17th Iranian Majlis, until his government was overthrown in the 1953 Iranian coup d'état aided by the intelligence agencies of the United Kingdom (MI6) and the United States (CIA), led by Kermit Roosevelt Jr. As prime minister, he implemented policies that came to be known as Mosaddeghism.

Despite its historical role in the nationalization of Iran's oil industry, the Mosaddeghist movement faced internal political and organizational divisions among its constituent groups. Disagreements within the National Front leadership, the loss of support from certain political and religious allies, and controversial decisions concerning the administration of the country and relations with the Majlis (Iranian Parliament) contributed to the weakening of the movement's cohesion. These factors, alongside foreign pressure and the activities of domestic opposition groups, contributed to the growing vulnerability of Mosaddegh's government in the months leading up to the 1953 Iranian coup d'état (28 Mordad 1332).

Before its removal from power, his administration introduced a range of social and political measures such as social security, land reforms and higher taxes including the introduction of taxation on the rent of land. His time as prime minister was marked by the clash with the British government, known as the Abadan Crisis, following the nationalisation of the Iranian oil industry, which had been built by the British on Persian lands since 1913 through the Anglo-Persian Oil Company (APOC/AIOC), later known as British Petroleum (BP).

In the aftermath of the overthrow, Mohammad Reza Pahlavi consolidated power and negotiated the Consortium Agreement of 1954 with the British, which gave split ownership of Iranian oil production between Iran and Western companies until 1979. Mosaddegh's National Front was accordingly suppressed in the undemocratically manipulated 1954 general election and he was subsequently charged with treason, imprisoned for three years, then put under house arrest until his death and was buried in his own home in order to prevent a political furor.

In 2013, during the presidency of Barack Obama, the United States government formally acknowledged its role in the coup as being a part of its foreign policy initiatives, including paying protesters and bribing officials.

== Early life, education and political career ==
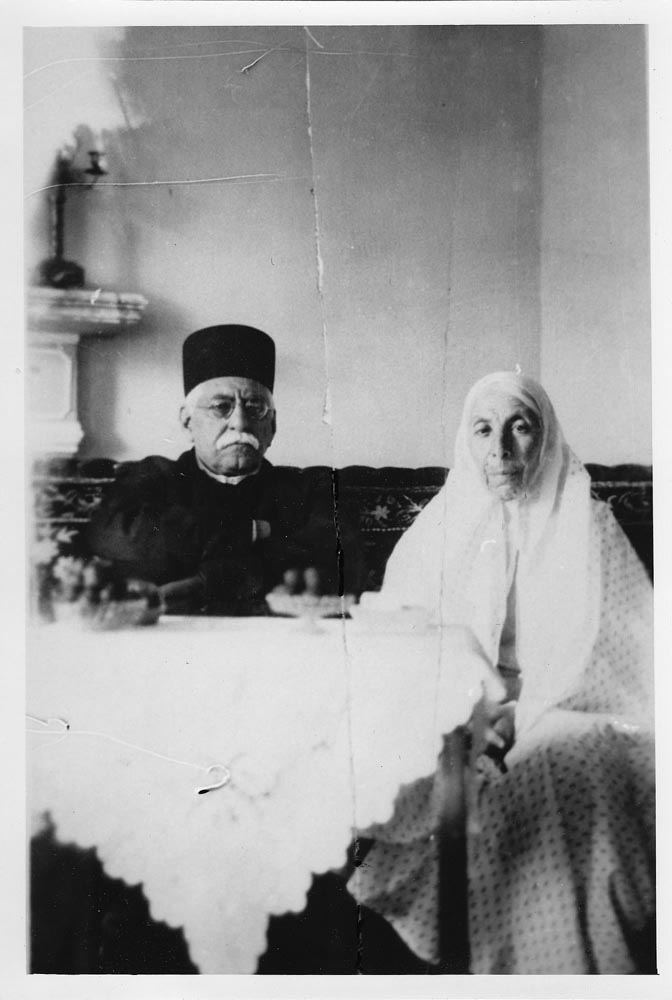
Mosaddegh's uncle Abdol-hossein Mirza Farman-Farma and mother Princess Malek Taj Najm-al-Saltaneh

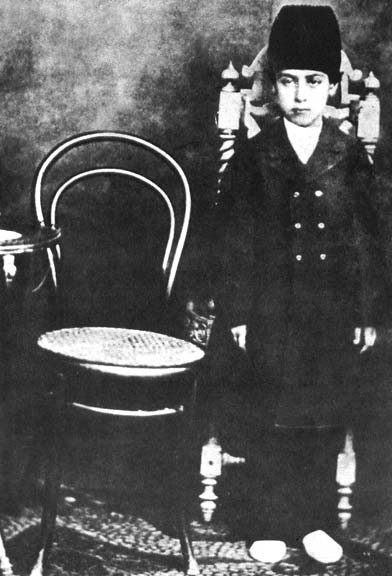
Young Mosaddegh

Mosaddegh was born to a prominent family of high officials in Ahmadabad, near Tehran, on June 16, 1882; his father, Mirza Hideyatu'llah Ashtiani, was the finance minister under the Qajar dynasty, and his mother, Princess Malek Taj Najm-es-Saltaneh, was the granddaughter of the reformist Qajar prince Abbas Mirza, and a great-granddaughter of Fath-Ali Shah Qajar. When Mosaddegh's father died in 1892 of cholera, his uncle was appointed the tax collector of the Khorasan province and was bestowed with the title of Mosaddegh-ol-Saltaneh by Naser al-Din Shah Qajar.

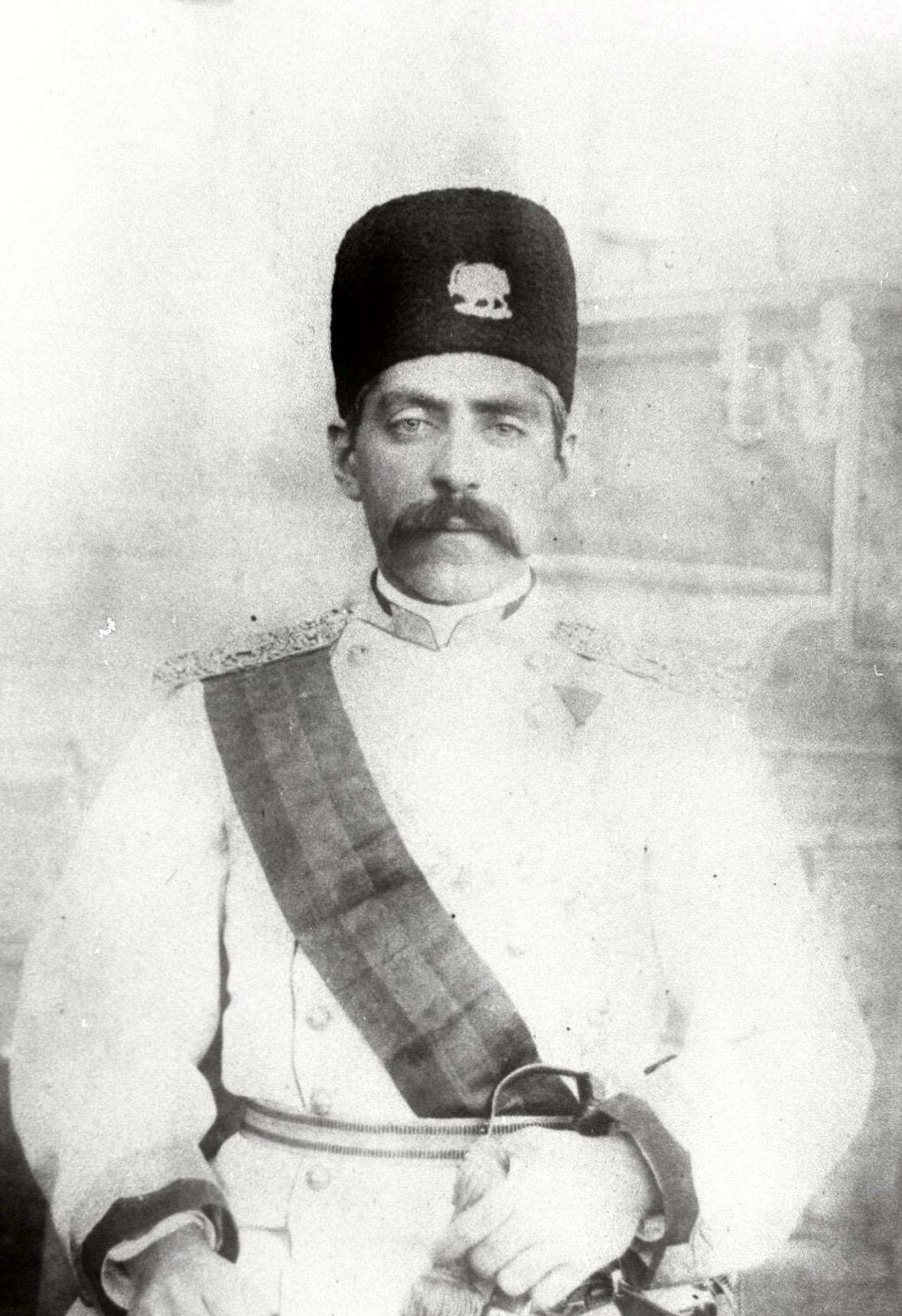
Abdol-Hossein Mirza Farman Farma, 11th Prime Minister of Iran(1915–1916) and Mosaddegh's maternal uncle

Mosaddegh himself later bore the same title, by which he was still known to some long after titles were abolished. (Note: "Older people still speak of Dr. Musaddiq as Musaddiqu's-Saltanah.") Mosaddegh's mother wanted her son to marry his cousin, daughter of her sister and Mozaffar ad-Din Shah Qajar. In 1901, Mosaddegh married Zahra Emami (1879–1965), a granddaughter of Naser al-Din Shah through her mother Zi'a es-Saltaneh.

=== Education ===
In 1909, Mosaddegh pursued education abroad in Paris, France, where he studied at the Institut d'études politiques de Paris (Sciences Po). He studied there for two years, returning to Iran because of illness in 1911. After two months, Mosaddegh returned to Europe to study a Doctorate of Laws (doctorat en Droit) at the University of Neuchâtel in Switzerland. In June 1913, Mosaddegh received his doctorate and in doing so became the first Iranian to receive a PhD in law from a European university.

Mosaddegh taught at the Tehran School of Political Science at the start of World War I before beginning his political career.

=== Political career ===
Mosaddegh started his political career with the Iranian Constitutional Revolution of 1905–07. At the age of 24, he was elected from Isfahan to the newly inaugurated Persian Parliament, the Majlis of Iran. He was unable to assume his seat, because he had not reached the legal age of 30. During this period he also served as deputy leader of the Society of Humanity, under Mostowfi ol-Mamalek.

In protest of the Anglo-Persian Treaty of 1919, he relocated to Switzerland, from where he returned the following year after being invited by the new Iranian prime minister, Hassan Pirnia (Moshir-ed-Dowleh), to become his minister of justice. While en route to Tehran, he was asked by the people of Shiraz to become the governor of the Fars province.

In 1921, he was appointed finance minister, in the government of Ahmad Qavam (Qavam os-Saltaneh). In June 1923, he became the foreign minister in the government of Moshir-ed-Dowleh. He then became governor of the Azerbaijan Province. In 1923, he was re-elected to the Majlis.

In 1925, the supporters of Reza Khan in the Majlis proposed legislation to dissolve the Qajar dynasty and appoint Reza Khan the new Shah. Mosaddegh voted against such a move, arguing that such an act was a subversion of the 1906 Iranian constitution. He gave a speech in the Majlis, praising Reza Khan's achievements as prime minister while encouraging him to respect the constitution and stay as the prime minister. On 12 December 1925, the Majlis deposed the young Ahmad Shah Qajar and declared Reza Shah the new monarch of the Imperial State of Persia, and the first shah of the Pahlavi dynasty. Mosaddegh then retired from politics, due to disagreements with the new regime.

In 1941, Reza Shah Pahlavi was forced by the British to abdicate in favour of his son Mohammad Reza Pahlavi. In 1944, Mosaddegh was once again elected to parliament. This time he took the lead of Jebhe Melli (National Front of Iran, created in 1949), an organisation he had founded with nineteen others such as Hossein Fatemi, Ahmad Zirakzadeh, Ali Shayegan and Karim Sanjabi, aiming to establish democracy and end the foreign presence in Iranian politics, especially by nationalising the Anglo-Iranian Oil Company's (AIOC) operations in Iran. In 1947 Mosaddegh once again announced retirement, after an electoral-reform bill he had proposed failed to pass through Majlis.

== Prime Minister of Iran ==
=== Election ===
On 28 April 1951, the Shah confirmed Mosaddegh as Prime Minister after the Majlis (Parliament of Iran) elected Mosaddegh by a vote of 79–12. After a period of assassinations by Fada'iyan-e Islam and political unrest by the National Front, the Shah was aware of Mosaddegh's rising popularity and political power. Demonstrations erupted in Tehran after Mosaddegh was elected, with crowds further invigorated by the speeches of members from the National Front.

There was a special focus on the Anglo-Iranian Oil Company and the heavy involvement of foreign actors and influences in Iranian affairs. Although Iran was not officially a colony or a protectorate, it was still heavily controlled by foreign powers beginning with concessions provided by the Qajar Shahs and leading up to the oil agreement signed by Reza Shah in 1933.

The new administration introduced a wide range of social reforms: unemployment compensation was introduced, factory owners were ordered to pay benefits to sick and injured workers, and peasants were freed from forced labour in their landlords' estates. In 1952, Mosaddegh passed the Land Reform Act, which forced landlords to pay a 20% tax on their revenue, half of which was placed in a development fund, while the rest went to the sharecropping tenants. This development fund paid for various projects such as public baths, rural housing, and pesticides.

In March 1951, Mosaddegh nationalised the Anglo-Iranian Oil Company, cancelling its oil concession, which was otherwise set to expire in 1993, and expropriating its assets. Mosaddegh saw the AIOC as an arm of the British government controlling much of the oil in Iran, pushing him to seize what the British had built in Iran. The next month, a committee of five majlis deputies was sent to Khuzestan to enforce the nationalisation. Mosaddegh justified his nationalisation policy by claiming Iran was "the rightful owner..." of all the oil in Iran. In a 21 June 1951 speech, he pointed out that Iran could use the money:

Our long years of negotiations with foreign countries... have yielded no results thus far. With the oil revenues, we could meet our entire budget and combat poverty, disease, and backwardness among our people. Another important consideration is that by the elimination of the power of the British company, we would also eliminate corruption and intrigue, by means of which the internal affairs of our country have been influenced. Once this tutelage has ceased, Iran will have achieved its economic and political independence. The Iranian state prefers to take over the production of petroleum itself. The company should do nothing else but return its property to the rightful owners. The nationalization law provides that 25% of the net profits on oil be set aside to meet all the legitimate claims of the company for compensation. It has been asserted abroad that Iran intends to expel the foreign oil experts from the country and then shut down oil installations. Not only is this allegation absurd; it is utter invention.

The confrontation between Iran and Britain escalated as Mosaddegh's government refused to allow the British any involvement in their former enterprise. Britain made sure Iran could not sell the oil, which it considered stolen. In July, Mosaddegh broke off negotiations with AIOC after it threatened to "pull out its employees" and told owners of oil tanker ships that "receipts from the Iranian government would not be accepted on the world market." Two months later, the AIOC evacuated its technicians and closed down the oil installations. Under nationalised management, many refineries lacked the trained technicians that were needed to continue production.

The British government announced a de facto blockade and embargo, reinforced its naval force in the Persian Gulf, and lodged complaints against Iran before the United Nations Security Council, where, on 15 October 1951, Mosaddegh declared that "the petroleum industry has contributed nothing to well-being of the people or to the technological progress or industrial development of my country."

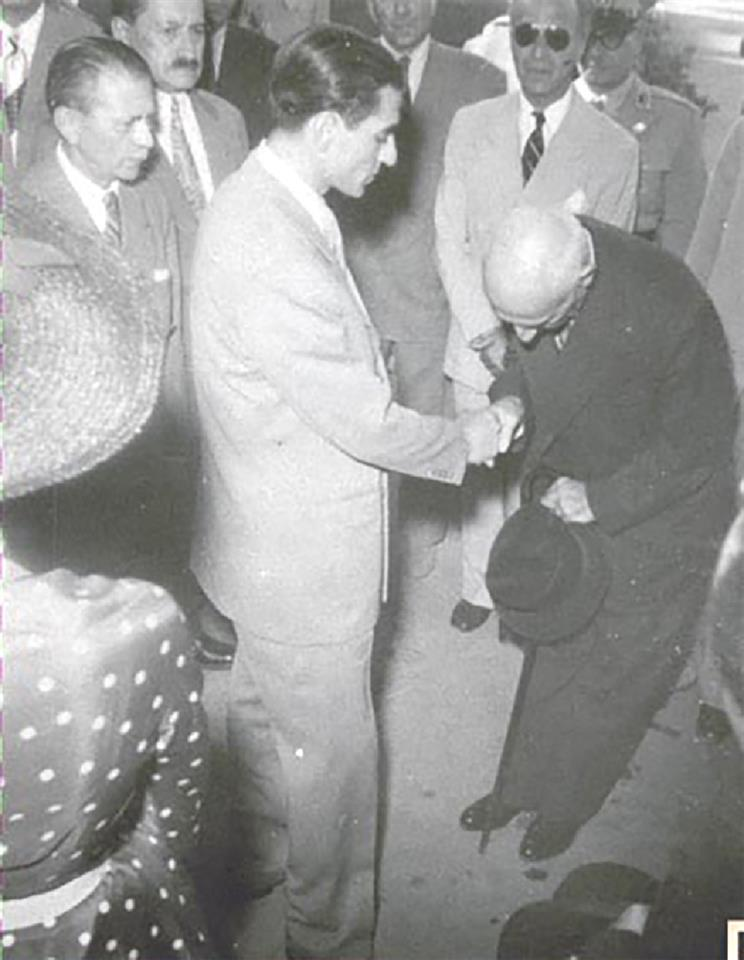
Mosaddegh shaking hands with Mohammad Reza Shah in their first meeting after Mosaddegh's election as Prime Minister

The British government also threatened legal action against purchasers of oil produced in the Iranian refineries and obtained an agreement with its sister international oil companies not to fill the void left by the AIOC. The entire Iranian oil industry came to a virtual standstill, with oil production dropping almost 96% from 664,000 barrels (105,600 m^{3}) in 1950 to 27,000 barrels (4,300 m^{3}) in 1952. This Abadan Crisis reduced Iran's oil income to almost nothing, putting a severe strain on the implementation of Mosaddegh's promised domestic reforms. At the same time, BP and Aramco doubled their production in Saudi Arabia, Kuwait, and Iraq to make up for lost production in Iran so that no hardship was felt in Britain.

Still enormously popular in late 1951, Mosaddegh called elections and introduced a modified version of his 1944 electoral reform bill. As his base of support was in urban areas and not in the provinces, the proposed reform no longer barred illiterate voters, but it placed them into a separate category from literate voters and increased the representation of the urban population. The opposition defeated the bill on the grounds that it would "unjustly discriminate patriots who had been voting for the last forty years", thus leaving the National Front to compete against conservatives, royalists, and tribal leaders alike in the upcoming election.

Tehran Mosavvar issue of 4 January 1952: "Dr. Mosaddegh facing political problems"

His government came under scrutiny for ending the 1952 election before rural votes could be fully counted. According to historian Ervand Abrahamian: "Realizing that the opposition would take the vast majority of the provincial seats, Mosaddegh stopped the voting as soon as 79 deputies—just enough to form a parliamentary quorum—had been elected." An alternative account is offered by journalist Stephen Kinzer: Beginning in the early 1950s under the guidance of C.M. Woodhouse, chief of the British intelligence station in Tehran, Britain's covert operations network had funnelled roughly £10,000 per month to the Rashidian brothers (two of Iran's most influential royalists) in the hope of buying off, according to CIA estimates, "the armed forces, the Majlis (Iranian parliament), religious leaders, the press, street gangs, politicians and other influential figures". Thus, in his statement asserting electoral manipulation by "foreign agents", Mosaddegh suspended the elections. His National Front party had made up 30 of the 79 deputies elected. Yet none of those present vetoed the statement, and completion of the elections was postponed indefinitely. The 17th Majlis convened in April 1952, with the minimum required (Note: Sources differ, either 79, 81, or 88 seats (Collier 2017) were elected in 1952.) of the 136 seats filled.

Throughout his career, Mosaddegh strove to increase the power parliament held versus the expansion of the crown's authority. But tension soon began to escalate in the Majlis. Conservative, pro-Shah, and pro-British opponents refused to grant Mosaddegh special powers to deal with the economic crisis caused by the sharp drop in revenue and voiced regional grievances against the capital Tehran, while the National Front waged "a propaganda war against the landed upper class".

=== Resignation and uprising ===
On 16 July 1952, during the royal approval of his new cabinet, Mosaddegh insisted on the constitutional prerogative of the Prime Minister to name a Minister of War and the Chief of Staff, something the Shah had done up to that point. The Shah refused, seeing it as unconstitutional and a means for Mosaddegh to consolidate his power over the government at the expense of the monarchy. In response, Mosaddegh announced his resignation, appealing directly to the public for support, pronouncing that "in the present situation, the struggle started by the Iranian people cannot be brought to a victorious conclusion."

Veteran politician Ahmad Qavam (also known as Ghavam os-Saltaneh) was appointed as Iran's new Prime Minister. On the day of his appointment, he announced his intention to resume negotiations with the British to end the oil dispute, a reversal of Mosaddegh's policy. The National Front—along with various Nationalist, Islamist, and socialist parties and groups—including Tudeh—responded by calling for protests, assassinations of the Shah and other royalists, strikes, and mass demonstrations in favour of Mosaddegh. Major strikes broke out in all of Iran's major towns, with the Bazaar closing down in Tehran. Over 250 demonstrators in Tehran, Hamadan, Ahvaz, Isfahan, and Kermanshah were killed or suffered serious injuries.

On the fourth day of mass demonstrations, Ayatollah Abol-Ghasem Kashani called on the people to wage a "holy war" against Qavam. On the following day, Si-ye Tir (the 30th of Tir on the Iranian calendar), military commanders ordered their troops back to barracks, fearful of over-straining the enlisted men's loyalty, and left Tehran in the hands of the protesters. Frightened by the unrest, the Shah asked for Qavam's resignation and re-appointed Mosaddegh to form a government, granting him control over the Ministry of War he had previously demanded. The Shah asked whether he should step down as monarch, but Mosaddegh declined.

=== Reinstatement and emergency powers ===
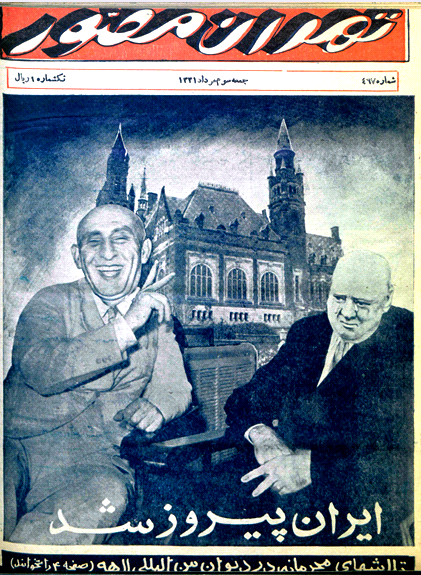
25 July 1952 issue of the Tehran Mosavvar: "Iran has won", featuring Mosaddegh and Churchill.

More popular than ever, a greatly strengthened Mosaddegh introduced a single-clause bill to parliament to grant him emergency powers for six months to pass "any law he felt necessary for obtaining not only financial solvency, but also electoral, judicial, and educational reforms" in order to implement his nine-point reform program and to bypass the stalled negotiations of the nationalisation of the oil industry.

On 3 August 1952, the Parliament voted in approval and elected Ayatollah Kashani as House Speaker. Kashani's Islamic scholars, as well as the Tudeh Party, proved to be two of Mosaddegh's key political allies, although relations with both were often strained.

In addition to the reform program, which intended to make changes to a broad region of laws covering elections, financial institutions, employment, the judiciary, the press, education, health, and communications services, Mosaddegh tried to limit the monarchy's powers. He cut the Shah's personal budget, forbade his direct communications with foreign diplomats, and transferred royal lands back to the state. He also expelled the Shah's politically active sister, Ashraf Pahlavi.

After six months of having emergency powers, in January 1953, Mosaddegh successfully pressed Parliament to extend his emergency powers for another 12 months.

Though the Shah had initiated land reforms shortly before in January 1951, where all territory inherited by the Crown was sold to peasants at 20% of the assessed value over a payment period of 25 years, Mosaddegh decreed a new land reform law to supersede it, establishing village councils and increasing the peasants' share of production. This weakened the landed aristocracy by imposing a 20% tax on their income, of which 20% was diverted back to the crop-sharing tenants and their rural banks. It also weakened them by levying heavy fines for compelling peasants to work without wages.

Mosaddegh attempted to abolish Iran's centuries-old feudal agriculture sector by replacing it with a system of collective farming and government land ownership, which also centralised power in his government. Ann Lambton indicates that Mosaddegh saw this as a means of checking the power of the Tudeh Party, who had been agitating the peasants by criticising his lack of significant land reforms.

Despite these accomplishments, Iranians were "becoming poorer and unhappier by the day", in large part due to the British-led boycott. As Mosaddegh's political coalition began to fray, his enemies increased in number.

Partly through the efforts of Iranians sympathising with the British, and partly in fear of the growing authority of the Prime Minister, several former members of Mosaddegh's coalition turned against him, fearing arrest. They included Mozzafar Baghai, head of the worker-based Toilers party; Hossein Makki, who had helped lead the takeover of the Abadan refinery and was at one point considered Mosaddegh's successor; and most outspokenly, Ayatollah Kashani, who damned Mosaddegh with the "vitriol he had once reserved for the British". The reason for difference of opinion among Makki and Mosaddegh was the sharp response of Mosaddegh to Kashani, who he saw as a largely inoffensive scholar who attracted public support. Hossein Makki strongly opposed the dissolution of the Parliament by Mosaddegh because he believed that the right to dismiss the Prime minister is reserved for the Shah.

== Overthrow of Mosaddegh ==
=== Plot to depose Mosaddegh ===
The British government had grown increasingly distressed over Mosaddegh's policies and were especially bitter over the loss of their control of the Iranian oil industry. Repeated attempts to reach a settlement had failed, and, in October 1952, Mosaddegh declared Britain an enemy and cut all diplomatic relations. Since 1935, the Anglo-Persian Oil Company had the exclusive rights to Iranian oil. Earlier in 1914, the British government had purchased 51% of its shares and become the majority shareholder. After the British Royal Navy converted its ships to use oil as fuel, the corporation was considered vital to British national security, and the company's profits partially alleviated Britain's budget deficit.

Engulfed in a variety of problems following World War II, Britain was unable to resolve the issue single-handedly and looked towards the United States to settle the matter. Initially, the US had opposed British policies. After mediation had failed several times to bring about a settlement, American Secretary of State Dean Acheson concluded that the British were "destructive, and determined on a rule-or-ruin policy in Iran."

The American position shifted in late 1952 when Dwight D. Eisenhower was elected president. In November and December, British intelligence officials suggested to American intelligence that the Iranian prime minister should be ousted. British prime minister Winston Churchill suggested to the incoming Eisenhower administration that Mosaddegh, despite the latter's open dislike of communism, would become reliant on the pro-Soviet Tudeh Party, resulting in Iran "increasingly turning towards communism" and towards the Soviet sphere at a time of high Cold War fears.

Though his suggestion was rebuffed by Eisenhower as "paternalistic", Churchill's government had already begun "Operation Boot", and simply waited for the next opportunity to press the Americans. On 28 February 1953, rumours spread by British-backed Iranians that Mosaddegh was trying to exile the Shah from the country gave the Eisenhower administration the impetus to join the plan. The United States and the United Kingdom agreed to work together toward Mosaddegh's removal and began to publicly denounce Mosaddegh's policies for Iran as harmful to the country.

In the meantime, the already precarious alliance between Mosaddegh and Kashani was severed in January 1953, when Kashani opposed Mosaddegh's demand that his increased powers be extended for a period of one year. Finally, to end what they perceived as Mosaddegh's destabilising influence that threatened the supply of oil back to the West and could potentially pave the way for a communist takeover of the country, the US made an attempt to depose him.

=== Operation Ajax ===
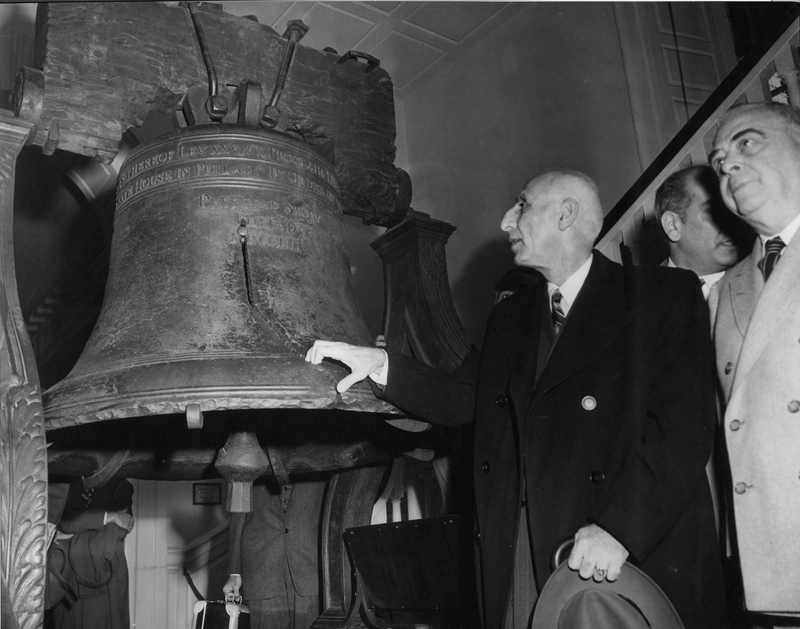
Mosaddegh visits the Liberty Bell in Philadelphia in 1951

In March 1953, Secretary of State John Foster Dulles directed the CIA, which was headed by his younger brother Allen Dulles, to draft plans to overthrow Mosaddegh. On 4 April 1953, Dulles approved $1 million to be used "in any way that would bring about the fall of Mosaddegh". Soon the CIA's Tehran station started to launch a propaganda campaign against Mosaddegh.

According to The New York Times, in early June, American and British intelligence officials met again, this time in Beirut, and put the finishing touches on the strategy. Soon afterward, according to his later published accounts, the chief of the CIA's Near East and Africa division, Kermit Roosevelt, Jr. the grandson of US President Theodore Roosevelt, arrived in Tehran to direct it. In 2000, The New York Times partially published a leaked CIA document titled Clandestine Service History – Overthrow of Premier Mosaddegh of Iran – November 1952 – August 1953.

The plot, known as Operation Ajax, centered on convincing Iran's monarch to issue a decree to dismiss Mosaddegh from office, as he had attempted some months earlier. But the Shah was afraid to attempt such a risky move against Mosaddegh. It would take several meetings with American officials, one of which included bribing his sister Ashraf with a mink coat and money, to successfully change his mind.

Mosaddegh became aware of the plots against him and grew increasingly wary of conspirators acting within his government. According to Donald Wilber, who was involved in the plot to remove Mosaddegh from power, in early August, Iranian CIA operatives pretending to be socialists and nationalists threatened Muslim leaders with "savage punishment if they opposed Mosaddegh", thereby giving the impression that Mosaddegh was cracking down on dissent, and stirring anti-Mosaddegh sentiments within the religious community.

A referendum to dissolve parliament and give the prime minister power to make law was submitted to voters, and it passed with 99 per cent approval, 2,043,300 votes to 1,300 votes against. According to historian Mark Gasiorowski, "There were separate polling stations for yes and no votes, producing sharp criticism of Mosaddegh" and that the "controversial referendum...gave the CIA's precoup propaganda campaign to show up Mosaddegh as an anti-democratic dictator an easy target". On 16 August, after an initial failed coup attempt by the CIA,the Parliament was suspended indefinitely, and Mosaddegh's emergency powers were extended.

Declassified documents released by the CIA in 2017 revealed that—after the Shah had fled to Italy—CIA headquarters believed the coup to have failed. Following the initial failed coup by the foreign-backed General Fazlollah Zahedi, the CIA sent Roosevelt a telegram on 18 August 1953 telling him to flee Iran immediately, but Roosevelt ignored it and began work on the second coup, circulating a false account that Mosaddegh attempted to seize the throne and bribed Iranian agents.

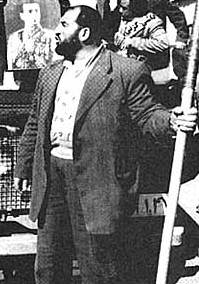
Tehran strongman Shaban Jafari played a major role in Mosaddegh's overthrow.

Soon, massive popular protests, aided by Roosevelt's team, took place across the city and elsewhere with tribesmen at the ready to assist the coup, with anti- and pro-monarchy protesters, both being paid by Roosevelt. By paying mobs to demonstrate, tricking Mosaddegh into urging his supporters to stay home, and bribing and mobilising officers against Mosaddegh, he was able to force a military confrontation outside Mosaddegh's home.

The protests turned increasingly violent, leaving almost 300 dead, at which point the pro-monarchy leadership, led by retired army General and former Minister of Interior in Mosaddegh's cabinet, Fazlollah Zahedi, interceded, joined with underground figures such as the Rashidian brothers and local strongman Shaban Jafari. Pro-Shah tank regiments stormed the capital and bombarded the prime minister's official residence.

With loyalist troops overwhelmed, Mosaddegh was taken into hiding by his aides, narrowly escaping the mob that set in to ransack his house. The following day, he surrendered himself at the Officers' Club, where General Zahedi had been set up with makeshift headquarters by the CIA. Zahedi announced an order for his arrest on the radio, and Mosaddegh was transferred to a military jail shortly after.

The Shah finally agreed to Mosaddegh's overthrow after Roosevelt said that the United States would proceed with or without him, and formally dismissed the prime minister in a written decree, an act that had been made part of the constitution during the Constitutional Assembly of 1949, convened under martial law, at which time the power of the monarchy was increased in various ways by the Shah himself.

As a precautionary measure, he flew to Baghdad and from there hid safely in Rome. He signed two decrees, one dismissing Mosaddegh and the other nominating the CIA's choice, General Zahedi, as Prime Minister. These decrees, called Farmāns, played a major role in giving legitimacy to the coup, and were further spread by CIA officials.

On 22 August, the Shah returned from Rome. Zahedi's new government soon reached an agreement with foreign oil companies to form a consortium and "restore the flow of Iranian oil to world markets in substantial quantities", giving the United States and Great Britain the lion's share of the restored British holdings. In return, the US massively funded the Shah's resulting government, until the Shah's overthrow in 1979.

Mosaddegh's seizure of power having failed and the counter coup having succeeded, many of Mosaddegh's former associates and supporters were tried, imprisoned, and tortured. Some were sentenced to death and executed. The minister of foreign affairs and the closest associate of Mosaddegh, Hossein Fatemi, was executed by order of the Shah's military court. The order was carried out by firing squad on 10 November 1954.

== Post-overthrow life ==
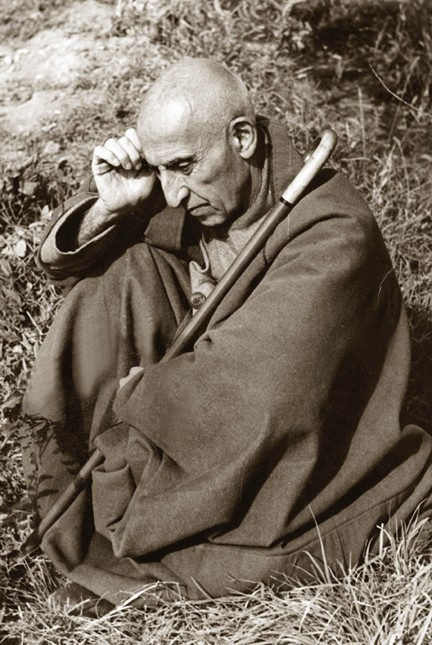
Mosaddegh under house arrest in Ahmadabad in 1965

On 21 December 1953, Mosaddegh was sentenced to three years' solitary confinement in a military prison, well short of the death sentence requested by prosecutors. After hearing the sentence, Mosaddegh was reported to have said with a calm voice of sarcasm: "The verdict of this court has increased my historical glories. I am extremely grateful you convicted me. Truly tonight the Iranian nation understood the meaning of constitutionalism."

== Death ==
Mosaddegh was kept under house arrest at his Ahmadabad residence, until his death on 5 March 1967 from cancer. Mosaddegh had been diagnosed with carcinoma in 1966, and undergone cancer treatment at Mehr hospital in Tehran in the form of radiation therapy. Mosaddegh's condition worsened in 1967, and, after ulcers in his stomach started bleeding, his condition was so bad that he was taken to Najmieh Hospital, where he died the same night.

Mosaddegh was denied a funeral and was buried in his living room, despite his request to be buried in the public graveyard, beside the victims of the political violence on 30th Tir 1331 (21 July 1952).

== Electoral history ==
| Year | Election | Votes | % | Rank | Notes |
|---|---|---|---|---|---|
| 1906 | Parliament | Unknown | | | Won but did not take seat |
| 1923 | Parliament | Unknown | | 3rd | Won |
| 1926 | Parliament | Unknown | | | Won |
| 1928 | Parliament | Unknown | | | Lost |
| 1943 | Parliament | ≈15,000 | Unknown | 1st | Won |
| 1947 | Parliament | Unknown | | | Lost |
| 1950 | Parliament | 30,738 | Unknown | 1st | Won |

== Family and children ==
- Zia Ashraf, (b. ?- d. 1991) married her cousin, politician Ezzatullah Bayat (son of her paternal aunt Showkat al-Dowleh and Abbasghali Bayat Sahm al-Mulk) and brother of Morteza-Qoli Bayat. Had offspring. Later divorced.
- Gholam-Hossein (b. 1906- d. 1990) educated as a doctor and served as his father's personal physician. Also held other positions such as Inspector-Genersl of the Central Committee Iranian Lion & Sun Org, Head of Iranian Delegation to International Committee of the Red Cross in 1946. Married Malekeh Khajeh-Nouri and had offspring.
- Ahmad (b. 1907 -d. ?) became an engineer, and held the position of Director General of the Ministry of Roads during his father's time as prime minister. Head of the State Railway Organization until being replaced by another official favoured by the shah's sister, Ashraf Pahlavi. After the shah had been deposed politically involved in the National Democratic Front. Married Amina Quds-e-Azam.
- Mansoureh (b.1908 - d.1979) married her cousin Ahmad Matin-Daftari. Had offspring, most notably the painter, Leyly Matin-Daftari and the politician, Hedayatollah Matin-Daftari, founder of the National Democratic Front. Died in a plane crash in 1979 while en route between Mashhad and Tehran.
- Yahya (b.1912-d.1912) died as an infant in Neuchatel from scarlet fever or measles.
- Mahmoud, died young in Tehran.
- Khadije (b. 1927 - d. 2003). One of her father's arrests, which she witnessed, left her so traumatized that she suffered a mental breakdown from which she never fully recovered. Undergoing many treatments she was eventually lobotomized and lived out the remainder of her life in a hospital in Switzerland.

== Legacy ==
=== Iran ===
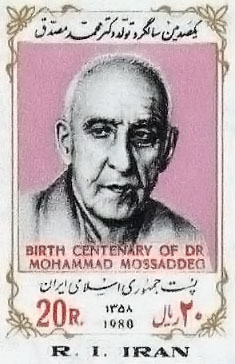
A stamp commemorating Mosaddegh's birth, 1980

Although Mosaddegh was never directly elected as Prime Minister, he enjoyed massive popularity throughout most of his career. Despite beginning to fall out of favour during the later stages of the Abadan Crisis, the secret U.S. overthrow of Mosaddegh served as a rallying point in anti-US protests during the 1979 Iranian revolution, and to this day he is one of the most popular figures in Iranian history.

The withdrawal of support for Mosaddegh by the powerful Shia clergy has been regarded as having been motivated by their fear of a communist takeover. Some argue that while many elements of Mosaddegh's coalition abandoned him, it was the loss of support from Ayatollah Abol-Ghasem Kashani and another cleric that was fatal to his cause, reflective of the dominance of the Ulema in Iranian society and a portent of the Islamic Revolution to come. The loss of the political clerics effectively cut Mosaddegh's connections with the lower middle classes and the Iranian masses which are crucial to any popular movement in Iran.

On 5 March 1979, not even a month after the Shah was deposed, hundreds of thousands of Iranians marked the 12th anniversary of Mosaddegh's death. In Ahmadabad, where he was buried, Iranian leaders and politicians eulogized him in a way that would have been unthinkable before the Shah's removal. It was estimated that the crowd in size was over one million. The event was described as:

For sixty solid miles, the highway from Tehran to Mosaddegh's burial site...transformed into a massive, unbroken daisy chain of cars...In the final seven or eight miles approaching the village, traffic became so gridlocked that mourners were forced to...complete the journey on foot.

=== U.S. ===
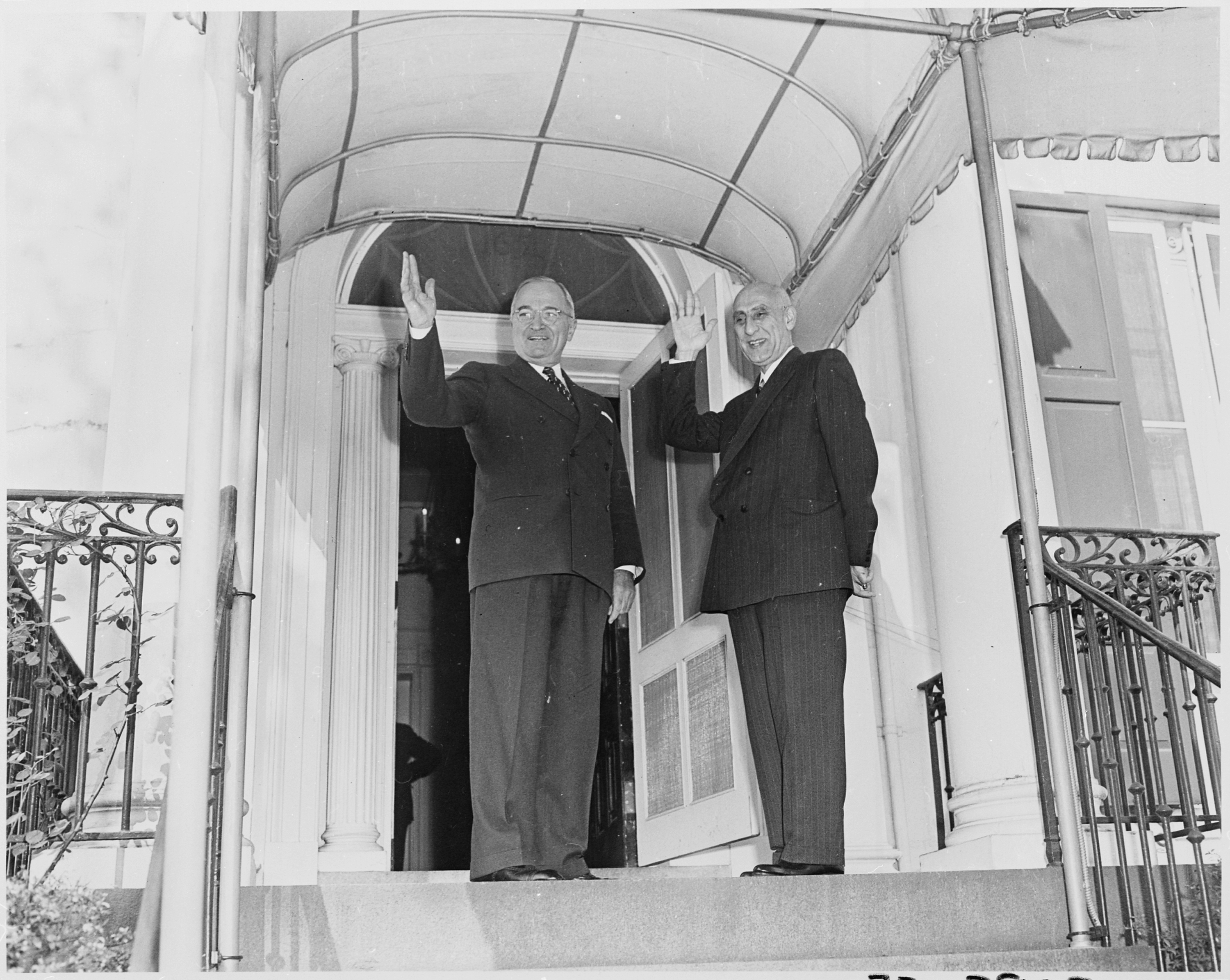
Prime Minister Mosaddegh with US President Truman in 1951

The U.S. role in Mosaddegh's overthrow was not formally acknowledged for many years, although the Eisenhower administration vehemently opposed Mosaddegh's policies. President Eisenhower wrote angrily about Mosaddegh in his memoirs, describing him as impractical and naive.

Eventually, the CIA's involvement with the coup was exposed. This caused controversy within the organisation and the CIA congressional hearings of the 1970s. CIA supporters maintained that the coup was strategically necessary and praised the efficiency of the agents responsible. Critics say the scheme was paranoid, colonial, illegal, and immoral—and truly caused the "blowback" suggested in the pre-coup analysis. The extent of this "blowback", over time, was not completely clear to the CIA, as they had an inaccurate picture of the stability of the Shah's regime.

The Iranian revolution of 1979 caught the CIA and the U.S. very much off guard, as CIA reporting a mere month earlier predicted no imminent insurrectionary turbulence whatsoever for the Shah's regime, and resulted in the overthrow of the Shah by a fundamentalist faction opposed to the U.S., headed by Ayatollah Khomeini. In retrospect, not only did the CIA and the U.S. underestimate the extent of popular discontent for the Shah, but much of that discontent historically stemmed from the removal of Mosaddegh and the subsequent clientelism of the Shah.

In March 2000, Secretary of State Madeleine Albright stated her regret that Mosaddegh was ousted: "The Eisenhower administration believed its actions were justified for strategic reasons. But the coup was clearly a setback for Iran's political development and it is easy to see now why many Iranians continue to resent this intervention by America." In the same year, The New York Times published a detailed report about the coup based on declassified CIA documents.

=== British ===
Mosaddegh's overthrow had a direct relationship with the creation of an Islamic revolution and the collapse of the Pahlavi government. America's close relationship with the Shah and the subsequent hostility of the United States to the Islamic Republic and Britain's profitable interventions caused pessimism for Iranians, stirring nationalism and suspicion of foreign interference.

== Mosaddegh in the media ==
- Mosaddegh was named man of the year in 1951 by Time. Others considered for that year's title included Dean Acheson, General (and future President) Dwight D. Eisenhower and General Douglas MacArthur.
- The figure of Mosaddegh was an important element in the 2003 French TV production Soraya, which deals with the life of the Shah's second wife and former Queen of Iran, Princess Soraya Esfandiary Bakhtiari. Mosaddegh's role was played by the French actor Claude Brasseur.
- In Argo, Malick (Victor McCay) references Mosaddegh and the coup as he and Bates (Titus Welliver) try to deal with the situation at the U.S. Embassy in Tehran.
- A short 24-minute film titled Mosaddegh, directed by Roozbeh Dadvand, was released in 2011. The role of Mosaddegh was played by Iranian American actor David Diaan.
- An independent video game called The Cat and the Coup was released in 2011. It features the player playing as Mosaddegh's cat reversing Mosaddegh's life to the beginning.
- In the 2016 Democratic presidential primaries, Senator Bernie Sanders, during debates, interviews, and speeches, repeatedly praised Mosaddegh's "secular, democratic government", while commenting on the 1953 CIA-backed coup, stating that it is a "bad example of U.S. foreign policy", resulting in "negative unintended consequences and dictatorships". Another candidate, Governor Martin O'Malley, said similar things.
- In Coup 53, a 2021 documentary, co-writers Taghi Amirani and Walter Murch assess new archive material about the 1953 CIA-backed coup of Mosaddegh. The documentary's primary contribution is to uncover the extent of MI6 involvement, particularly that of Norman Darbyshire, the operative who led MI6's involvement in the coup. According to the newly discovered archive material, Darbyshire was involved in the kidnapping, torture, and assassination of General Mahmoud Afshartous, Mosaddegh's chief of police, and the bribing of Princess Ashraf, the twin sister of Shah Reza Pahlavi, to obtain the Shah's approval for the coup. The British government has never admitted its involvement in the overthrow of Mosaddegh.
- In neighbouring Afghanistan, support and sympathy for Mosaddegh was evident in a 1953 article in the Kabul-based Pamir newspaper under the title "A friendly suggestion to the great nation of Iran", urging the authorities of the time to use best judgment during the trial regarding a man like Mosaddegh.

== See also ==
- Nationalization of the Iranian oil industry movement
- Coup 53
- Muhammad Kazim Khurasani
- Mirza Husayn Tehrani
- Abdallah Mazandarani
- Mirza Ali Aqa Tabrizi
- Mirza Sayyed Mohammad Tabatabai
- Seyyed Abdollah Behbahani
- Ruhollah Khomeini
- Islamic fundamentalism in Iran

Political offices
| Preceded by Hossein Ala' | Prime Minister of Iran; 1951–1952 | Succeeded by Ahmad Qavam |
| Preceded by Ahmad Qavam | Prime Minister of Iran; 1952–1953 | Succeeded by Fazlollah Zahedi |
Military offices
| Preceded by Mohammad Reza Shah | Commander-in-Chief of the Iranian Armed Forces; 1952–1953 | Succeeded by Mohammad Reza Shah |
Party political offices
| New title Organization founded | Leader of the National Front; 1949–1960 | Succeeded by Allahyar Saleh |
| New title Fraction founded | Head of the National Movement fraction 1950–1951 | Unknown Next known title holder: Ahmad Razavi |
Honorary titles
| Preceded by Ali Amini | First deputy of Tehran; 1950 | Succeeded by Hossein Makki |
| Preceded by Hassan Esfandiari | First deputy of Tehran; 1944 | Succeeded by Ali Amini |
