= Mahmoud Afshartous =

Iranian general (1907–1953)

Timsar Mahmoud Afshartous
- محمود افشارطوس
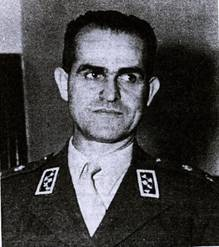
- Afshartous in an undated photo

Chief of the Shahrbani
- In office 19 February 1953 – 24 April 1953
- Monarch: Mohammad Reza Pahlavi
- Prime Minister: Mohammad Mosaddegh
- Preceded by: Mohammad Kazem Saleh Sheibani
- Succeeded by: Nasrallah Mudaber

Personal details
- Born: 1907 Tehran, Qajar Iran
- Died: 24 April 1953 (aged 45–46) Tehran, Pahlavi Iran
- Education: Officers' Academy

Military service
- Allegiance: Pahlavi Iran
- Branch/service: Imperial Iranian Ground Forces
- Years of service: 1929–1954
- Rank: Brigadier General; Major General (posthumously)
- Battles/wars: World War II; Anglo-Soviet invasion of Iran; Iran crisis of 1946

Mahmoud Afshartous (Persian: محمود افشارطوس; 1907 – 24 April 1953), also written Afshartoos, was an Iranian general and chief of police during the government of Prime Minister Mohammad Mosaddegh. Afshartous was abducted and killed by anti-Mossadegh conspirators led by MI6 which helped pave the way for the 1953 coup d'état.

== Early life and education ==
Afshartous came from an Iranian Azerbaijani-Kurdish family which was related to the Qajar dynasty. He was born in Tehran in 1907. He was a graduate of the Officers’ Academy.

=== Paternal family ===
His father was Hassan Khan Shebl as-Saltaneh, the eldest son of Mohammad Khan Afshar "Sartip", a notable Qajar officer by Mala Banu Khanom, the widow of Amir Isa Khan Vali Ehtesham ad-Dowleh Qajar-Qovanlou Amir Kabir. Therefore, Hassan Khan was the younger half brother of the famous Majd ed-Dowleh Qajar-Qovanlu Amirsoleimani and cousin of Naser al-Din Shah Qajar.

His career at court began 1868 as page boy (gholam) and he was known as Hassan Khan Afshar "Bashi". Later he became adjutant (Persian: ağūdān-e hozūr-e homāyūnī) to Naser al-Din Shah. Then he received the title Shebl as-Saltaneh (Lion Cub of the Monarchy) from the shah, and accompanied him on several trips. Shebl as-Saltaneh held a number of posts in court administration and he chose the name Afshar-e Tous, i.e. Afshar of the City of Tous, (or Afshartous) when family names were mandated in 1930.

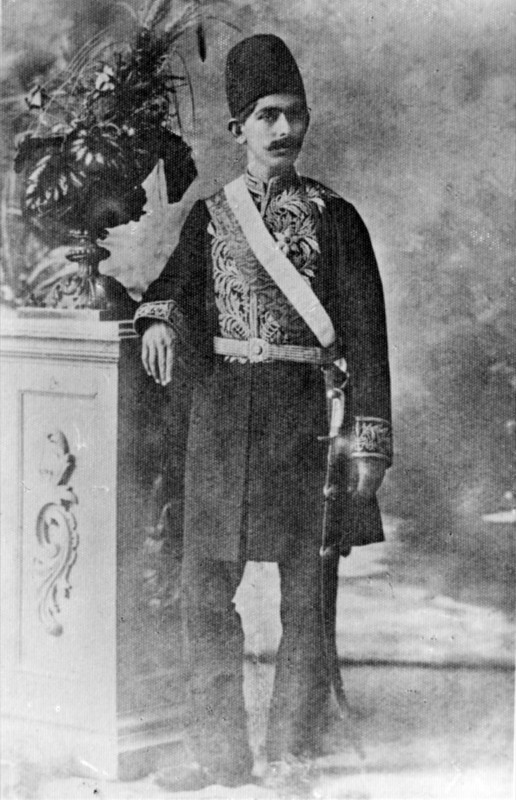
Hassan Khan Shebl as-Saltaneh

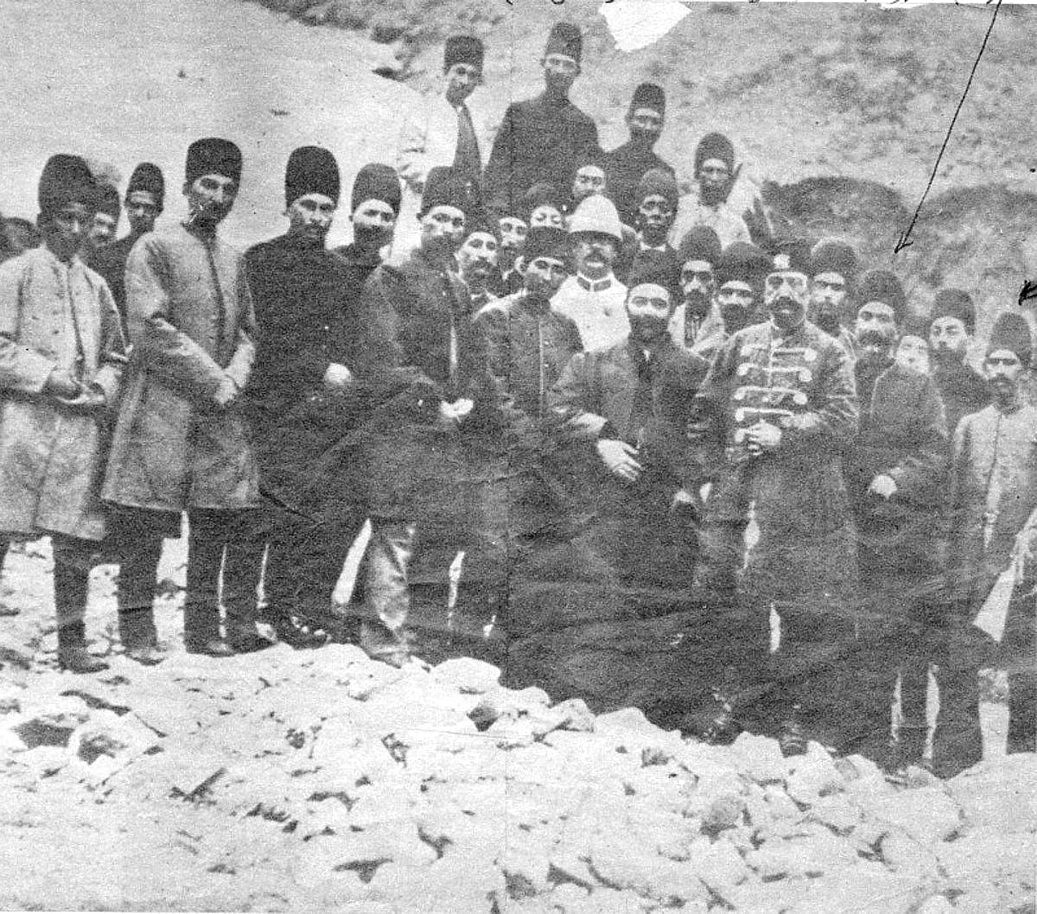
Naser al-Din Shah’s hunting party (Shebl as-Saltaneh far right, with rifle)

=== Maternal family ===
Afshartous' mother was Banou Fatemeh Soltan Khanom, from the Zarrinnaal line of the Zarrin Kafsh tribe (local Persian-Kurdish tribal chiefs and officials). Her father, Agha Mirza Zaman Khan Kordestani, came from Sanandaj in the Iranian province of Kordestān to Naser al-Din Shah's court. As a member of the Ardalanic nobility, he was appointed muster-master (lashkar-nevis) of the troops and married Pari Soltan Khanom Pir-Bastami from the Moayyeri clan (a niece of Naser al-Din Shah). Her brothers, Agha Mirza Ali Akbar Khan Zarrinnaal Nasr-e Lashkar and Mirza Ali Asghar Khan Zarrinkafsh, were successful under the Qajar and Pahlavi dynasties.

He had seven brothers (Shebl al-Mamalek, Khan-Khanha, Mohammad Sadegh, Mohammad Bagher, Morteza, Mostafa and Ali) and two sisters (Akhtar as-Saltaneh and Banou Ozma) with the surname Afshartous (or Afshartoos), and they married into the Amirsoleymani and Zarrinkafsh families.

=== Relationship to the Pahlavis ===
Afshartous was related to the Pahlavi dynasty through Touran Khanom Amirsoleymani (Qajar-Quvanlou) Qamar al-Molouk, third wife of Reza Shah and mother of Prince Gholam Reza Pahlavi. Touran was related to Afshartous' father and a cousin of Afshartous' second wife, Fatemeh Bayat (Mossadegh's grandniece).

== Career ==
After the Persian Constitutional Revolution during the first decade of the 20th century, Afshartous' father became concerned about the political situation in Iran and temporarily left the country in 1909. His uncle Majid ad-Dowleh, the elder of the Qajar dynasty, encouraged him to pursue a military education. After graduating from Nezam High School in Tehran, Afshartous entered military service as a cadet at Tehran Military University.

In 1936, he was introduced to Reza Shah by two-star General (sar-lashkar) Karim Buzarjomehri, and got his first job as chief of royal property (amlak-e saltanati). Afshartous later joined the artillery corps, promoted to one-star general (or brigadier-general—sartip) of the Imperial Iranian Forces, headed Reza Shah's funeral procession and made military governor of Tehran by Mohammad Reza Pahlavi. He took steps against corruption in the army, and supported his granduncle Mossadegh's policy by forming the National Front (jebh-e melli). On 23 July 1952, when Mossadegh was prime minister, Afshartous was appointed Iranian chief of police. He was in office until April 1953.

A quiet, firm and disciplined person with few friends, he desired change in the political system of Iran to combat corruption (especially bribery in military):

Many times he dismissed different graded officers in order to defend transparency and believed that certain officers have to promote only up to certain levels otherwise they rotten. All and all his idea was based on transparency and honesty and he refused to compromise, for this reason he had many enemies.

— A. Afshartous, 2012, in an interview about Afshartous

A loyal supporter of Mossadegh (known as his "right hand") and popular with the people, he became a threat to the political circles around Pahlavi.

== Death ==
When Prime Minister Mohammad Mossadegh (leader of the National Front, a liberal democrat and a nationalist) increasingly governed without parliament to lessen the Shah's power, some politicians feared that his democratic measures would end in despotism. Mossadegh organized a plebiscite to dissolve the parliament. The opposition feared that he would ally with the communist Tudeh party, become a Soviet-influenced dictator and abolish the Iranian monarchy.

In March 1953, the imperial court, aided by clergy, expelled army officers and politicians, organized a conspiracy against the prime minister. Mozaffar Baqai, founding member of the Iranian Toilers' party and former Mossadegh associate, allied with General Fazlollah Zahedi (a friend of the Shah) to depose Mossadegh. To prepare for the coup the police apparatus had to be dismantled, and the conspirators met at Baqai's house to plan the murder of the chief of police. Afshartous was kidnapped when he was lured to Hossein Khatibi's house for a meeting. He was brought to the mountains near Tehran, tortured and strangled by a group headed by Khatibi on 24 April 1953. Khatibi affirmed that Afshartous had documents describing a roundup of US agents and supporters of the Shah. This sealed Afshartous' fate, and the plot against the prime minister ended with the CIA-sponsored coup d’etat of 19 August 1953, later known as Operation Ajax.

Afshartous was posthumously promoted to two-star general (or major-general— sar-lashkar) by Mossadegh, and he was buried in Tehran's Tajrish neighborhood at the Reza-Pahlavi-Hospital (known as Afshartous Hospital at the beginning of the 1979 Iranian Revolution, and later Shohada (Martyr) Hospital). The Shah sent his half-brother, Prince Gholam Reza, to Banou Fatemeh Soltan's house to extend condolences from the Pahlavi monarchy. Banou Fatemeh Afshartous, grieving the loss of her son, asked the prince: "I am wondering that my son's murderer sent you to come here. What did my son do wrong than only being a real patriot who loved his country? What did my son do wrong in the eyes of his murderer, the Shah, your brother?" The prince left, and Afshartous' family cut its ties to the imperial court.
