= Ali Zohari =

Iranian politician

Member of Parliament
- In office 27 April 1952 – 16 August 1953
- Constituency: Tehran

Personal details
- Party: Toilers Party
- Other political affiliations: National Front (1951–1952)

Ali Zohari (Persian: علی زهری) was an Iranian politician.

A protégé of Mozzafar Baghai, he was elected to the parliament in 1952 election as a senior Toilers Party of the Iranian Nation member supported by the National Front. He soon broke away from the National Front along with his fellow party members. On 6 July 1953, he moved to initiate the motion of censure for government of Mossadegh.
