= Ahmad Zirakzadeh =

- Born: 6 March 1908; Shahr-e Kord, Iran
- Died: 25 August 1993 (aged 85); Tehran, Iran
- Organization: National Front

Ahmad Zirakzadeh (Persian: احمد زیرک‌زاده; 6 March 1908 – 25 August 1993) was one of the founders of National Front of Iran, an Iranian party which was considered the backbone of Mohammad Mosaddegh's government. He made history by defending the country against Operation Ajax.

== Early life ==
He was born in 1907 to a Yazdi father and mother in a religious family in Tehran. His father, Mirza Zirak, was an Islamic cleric who traveled a lot and in one of his trips he visited a Bakhtiari khan (Sepahkhan) who took Mirza Zirak with him to Tehran, where Ahmad was born. Later his family migrated to a Bakhtiari town, Shahrekord, which was called Dehe Kord at that time. After the Iranian Constitutional Revolution, some of the Bakhtiari khans decided their sons to go to France to study in western universities and see the western culture which was considered an honor at that time, so they chose Mirza Zirak to go with their children as an elder and Mirza Zirak took his older son Gholamhossein with him. After Gholamhossein returned from Europe to Iran he talked to Ahmad about democracy and nationalism which he had seen in France and these ideas and thoughts had a great effect on Ahmad’s later political life.

== Education ==
In 1925 Ahmad Zirakzadeh went to Tehran to Dar ul-Funun high school. After one year he won a scholarship from Iran ministry of defense and went to Polytechnic university of Paris to study marine engineering where he saw a totally different world from Iran.

== Political life ==
After returning to Iran in 1935 he had to work for navy because of his scholarship so he went to Khorramshahr and worked there as a navy officer and in 1941 was transferred to ministry of transportation in Bandar Anzali. After the strike of engineers in 1943 he felt that he “had to change something” so he went to Tehran and was elected as a head member of center of engineers (Persian: کانون مهندسین).

Zirakzadeh, Farivar, Shafagh, Moazemi and some others founded Iran party which was a nationalist party and considered as one of the most important columns of National Front of Iran and the backbone of Mohammed Mosaddeq's government and Zirakzadeh became the secretary general of the party. The first Iran party’s newspaper was Shafagh(Persian: شفق) with the management of Dr.Jazayeri and the second newspaper was published by Zirakzadeh with the name of Jebhe(Persian: جبهه). Later the Iran party formed an alliance with Tudeh party which defaced its reputation.

After the election of Mosaddeq as the prime minister of Iran in 1951, Zirakzadeh became the economy ministry deputy. Later, in 1952 parliament elections his name was put in National Front of Iran list with other eleven members and he was elected as a member of 17th parliament for the people of Tehran and continued to work on nationalization of oil with Mosaddeq, Hossein Fatemi, Makki, Hasibi, Asghar Parsa and other members of National Front of Iran.

== The 1953 coup and after ==
He was in Mosaddeq's house in 1953 coup -which was triggered by CIA - and broke his leg while he tried to escape there. After the coup he hid from the government for about 2.5 years then he was arrested and was in prison for about five months. After release he established a private business. He was arrested again in 1957 because Shah who was in power again after the 1953 coup suspected that he was working against the government. He became a member of the second National front of Iran after release but he was not as active as the past in this new political party as he himself has said “I did not have the Heat that I used to have before”. He went to the United States in 1980 one year after the Islamic revolution and lived there for many years before his return to Iran.

Before his death he made a will to establish a science foundation with his money which is now operating under the name of Zirakzadeh Science foundation in Tehran.

He died in 1993 at the age of 86 in Tehran and is buried in Beheshte Zahra.

== See also ==
- Mohammed Mosaddeq
