= National Movement fraction =

Iranian parliamentary group (1950–1953)

- Chamber: Iranian Parliament
- Legislature(s): 16th, 17th
- Foundation: 1950
- Dissolution: 1953
- Previous name(s): National Caucus
- Member parties: Iran Party; Toilers Party (until 1952); Muslim Warriors (until 1952)
- President: Mohammad Mosaddegh (1950–1951); Ahmad Razavi (1952–1953)
- Spokesperson: Asghar Parsa (1952–1953)

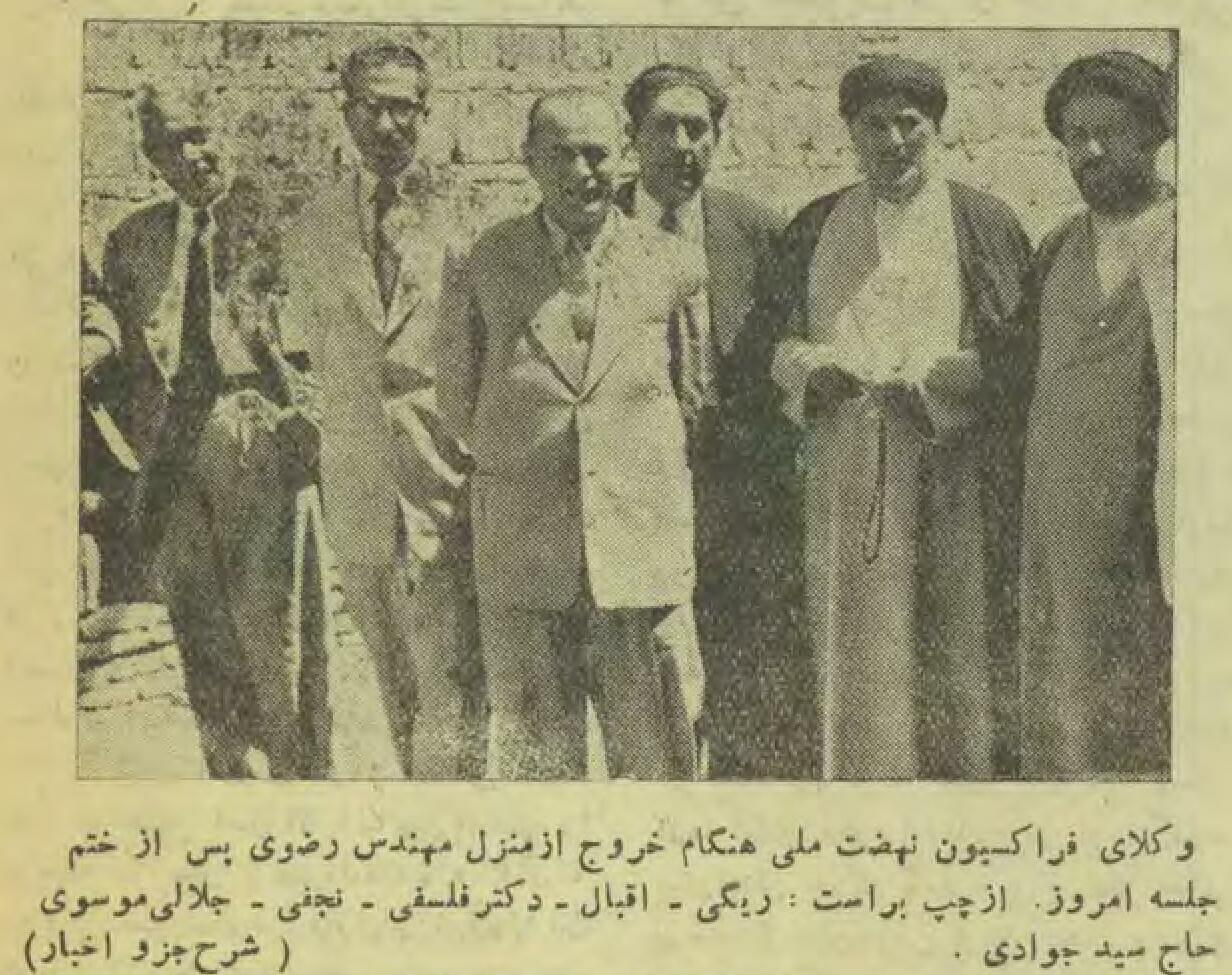
National Movement Franction members, 1953

The National Movement fraction (Persian: فراکسیون نهضت ملی) was the parliamentary group of the National Front in the Iranian Parliament. From 1950 to 1952, it was named the 'National Caucus' (Persian: فراکسیون وطن).

== Historical membership ==
Years	Seats	Change	Ref
1950–1952	11 / 136	Steady	
1952–1953	32 / 79	▲21	
