= Adib Boroumand =

Iranian poet, politician and lawyer

- ادیب برومند

Head of Leadership Council of National Front of Iran
- In office 5 July 2000 – 13 March 2017
- Preceded by: Ali Ardalan
- Succeeded by: Dr Hossein Mousavian

Chairman of Central Council of National Front of Iran
- In office 1994 – 13 March 2017
- Preceded by: Dr Mehdi Azar
- Succeeded by: Dr Hossein Mousavian

Personal details
- Born: Abdol-Ali Boroumand; 11 June 1924 Gaz, Borkhar County, Isfahan, Persia
- Died: 13 March 2017 (aged 92) Tehran, Iran
- Resting place: Gaz, Isfahan province, Iran
- Party: National Front of Iran; Iran Party
- Spouse: Farangis Amini
- Children: 3
- Education: Tehran University
- Occupation: Poet, Political activist and Attorney at law
- Website: www.adibboroumand.com

Adib Boroumand (or Adīb Borūmand) (Persian: ادیب برومند; 11 June 1924 – 13 March 2017) was an Iranian poet, politician, and lawyer. He was the head of the leadership council and chairman of the central council of the National Front of Iran. He is known as the national poet of Iran.

He was born on 11 June 1924 in Gaz, Borkhar County, Isfahan, Persia (present-day Iran). He received a BA in Judicial Law from the University of Tehran, and since then he had been lived in Tehran. He died on 13 March 2017 at the age of 92.

== Early life ==
=== Public life ===
Abdol Ali (Adib) Boroumand was born on 11 June 1924 in Gaz, Borkhar, Esfahan, Persia (now Iran). His father was a historian and a writer, while his mother was interested in education and culture. At the age of six, Adib gained literacy. He began to attend school at the age of eight, and eventually earned his high school diploma, while studying literature. He began writing prose at the age of sixteen, eventually creating poems, and forming an interest in poems written by constitutionalists.

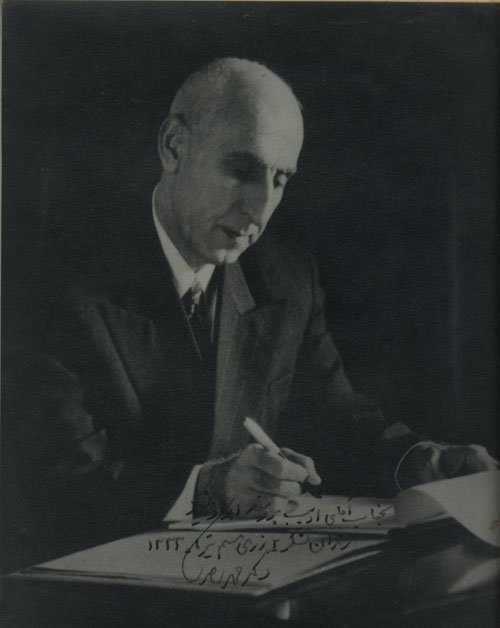
Mohammad Mosaddegh, the founder of the National Front and the overthrown Prime Minister of Iran. Adib was a supporter of Mosaddegh's movement. Mosaddegh gifted this image to Adib. The text on the image: "Dedicated to Mr. Adib Boroumand. Prison of 2nd Armorial Division, Tir 20 1333 [July 11, 1954].

He began his political career during the Anglo-Soviet invasion of Iran. He wrote about Iranian nationalism, while criticizing the rule of Reza Shah and calling it a dictatorship. He also criticized the invading forces by writing against capitalism and promoting nationalism and patriotism. His poems could be found in print while reading Tehran's newspapers at the time. During this time, he published his first book, titled Groaning of Homeland. Its popularity led him to gain the title of the "National Poet of Iran".

After the war, Adib obtained his bachelor's degree in judicial law from the University of Tehran, while still studying literature and learning French and Arabic. He then began to write about what he believed to be a need for reform in Persia, acquainting himself with political parties and politicians in the nation. He then wrote his second book named Iran Opera in Tumult, a controversial piece of writing which complained about the bad conditions that many people believed were in place in the country at the time. Adib refused his appointment to the public prosecutor in the Ardabil Administration of Justice, instead of becoming an independent lawyer and eventually becoming a lawyer for the Iranian national bank. He also refused offers for any position in government.

During the Iran crisis of 1946, Adib once again became politically active by writing in opposition to the Azerbaijani Democratic Party and Ja'far Pishevari, even though he had previously established close relations with the communists Tudeh Party of Iran.

Adib became a strong supporter of Prime Minister Mohammad Mosaddegh's national movement and his nationalizing of the oil industry, along with many other Iranians at the time. He also created many poems in favor of Mosaddegh. His poems were used as propaganda by Mosaddegh's government and supporters by being read out on radio broadcasts and passed out on paper pamphlets. During the 1953 Iranian coup d'état, Adib, alongside the National Front, fought against the newly established regime. He called Mohammad Reza Pahlavi's rule a "dictatorship", which landed him in prison. He was then jailed two more times. He became a central member of the National Front in 1960 and advocated a revolution. He participated in the Senna parliament sit-in against "lack of freedom", whose participants were jailed. After this, Adib was elected as one of the five board members during Karim Sanjabi's reorganization of the National Front. They then held protests which were prevented by Imperial Iran. This led them to hold their meetings in secret from then on out.

Adib was then elected leader of the National Front after the Iranian Revolution, and had been the leader since 2000. From this position, he has advocated freedom and democracy in Iran. He also founded a "culture house" in his hometown, dedicated a version of the Quran to the National Library of Iran in 2008, and founded the "Adib Boroumand Art School". During this time, he wrote Worrisome Days.

=== Personal life ===
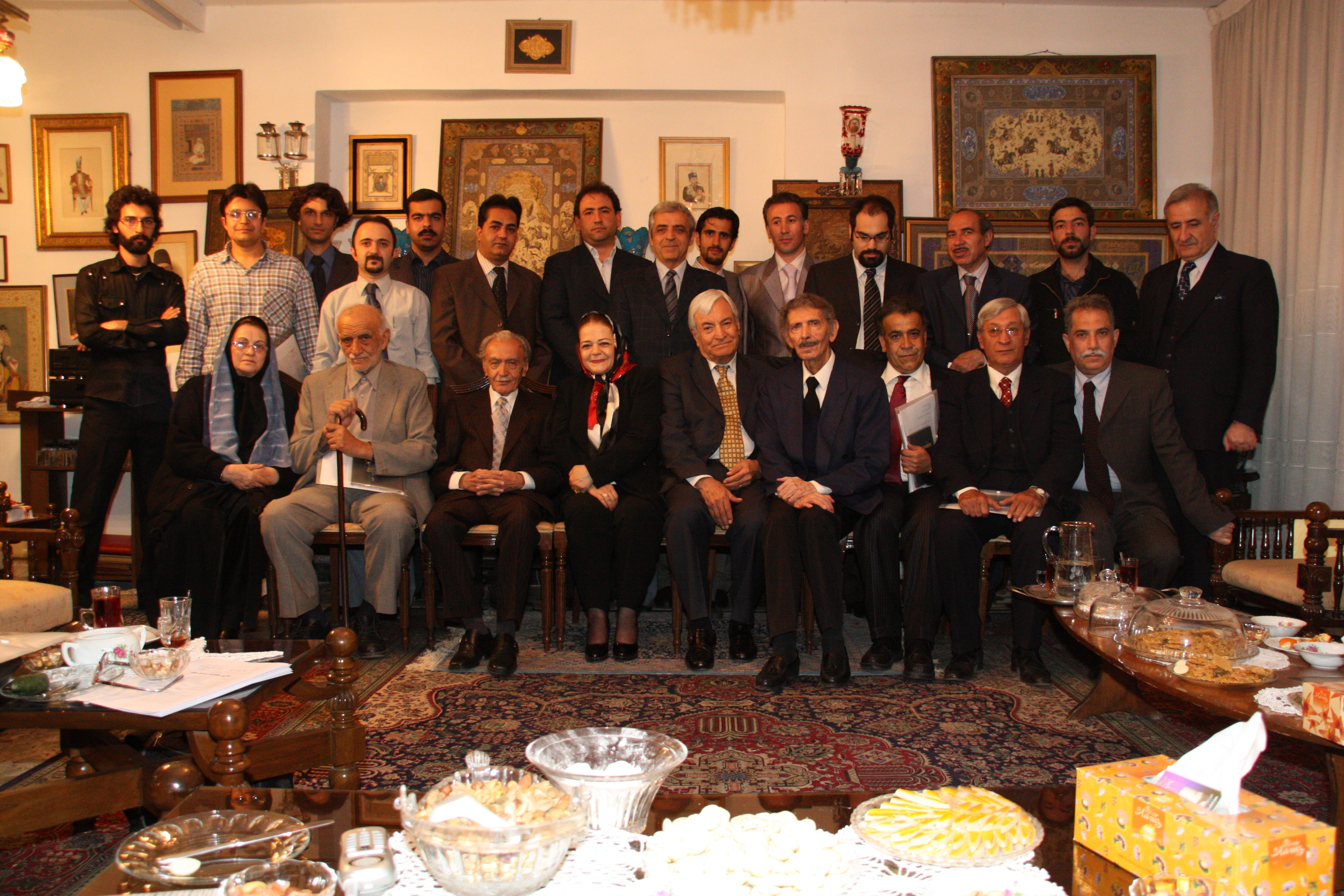
NF leaders in Adib House in 2010

Adib's late wife, Farangis Amini, was a "religious beneficent" whom he married in 1947. Similar to Adib, she studied politics, literature, and culture, and assisted Adib in his career until her death sometime in the mid-late 2000s. He had three children with her: a dentist named Jahanshah, a lawyer named Poorandokht, and a commercial company founder named Shahryar. Adib Boroumand died on 13 March 2017 in his home in Tehran, when he was 92. His funeral took place on 16 March and he was buried in the "Boroumand Library" in his hometown in Gaz.

== Published works ==
The following is a list of published books by Adib Boroumand. Adib also has "improved" many books that are not listed here.

- Nalehayeh Vatan: "Groaning Of Homeland" (1941)
- Payam Azadi: "Message of Freedom"
- Dard Ashena: "Pain Acquainted"
- Soroode Rahayi: "The Song of Deliverance"
- Raze Parvaz: "The Secret of Flight"
- Masnavi Esphahan: "Esphahan Masnavid"
- Hassle Hasti: "The Result of Existence"

== See also ==
- Human rights in Iran
- Hootan Dolati

== Notes ==
1.Adib is the male national poet and served this position alongside his female equivalent, Simin Behbahani, who died. Both positions are referred to as "National Poet of Iran".

Party political offices
Vacant Title last held by Karim Sanjabi	Leader of the National Front; 1993–2017	Vacant Title next held by Seyed Hossein Mousavian
