= Ahmad Razavi =

Iranian engineer (1906–1971)

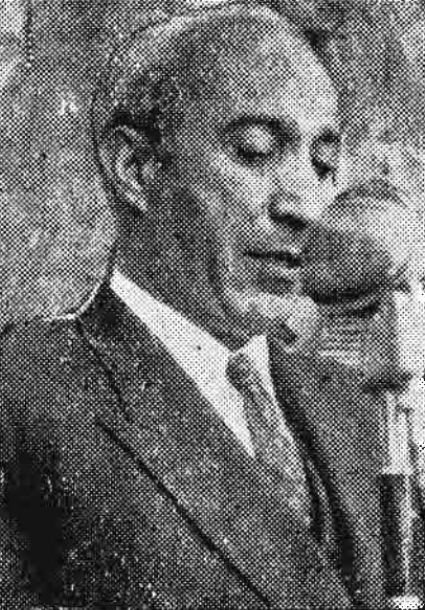
- Razavi in 1953

Member of Parliament
- In office 27 April 1952 – 16 August 1953 Serving with Mozzafar Baghai
- Constituency: Kerman
- In office 12 June 1947 – 28 July 1949 Serving with Mozzafar Baghai
- Constituency: Kerman

Personal details
- Born: 1906 Kerman, Persia
- Died: 1971 (aged 64–65)
- Party: Iran Party; National Front
- Other political affiliations: Democrat Party (1946–48)

Seyyed Ahmad Razavi (Persian: سید احمد رضوی; 1906–1971) was an Iranian engineer and politician.

== Early life and education ==
Razavi was born in 1906 in Kerman. Hailed from a landed upper-class family, his father headed Shaykhi community in Kerman. He was graduated from the French Lycée in Tehran, before he went to study mineral engineering in France.

== Career ==
Razavi attended the founding meeting of Tudeh Party of Iran in 1941 and initially supported the party. He was a co-founder of the Engineers’ Association, and its offshoot Iran Party. In 1946, he joined Democrat Party of Ahmad Qavam, and sided with its radical faction. The next year entered the 15th term of parliament representing his hometown Kerman, and became a well-known deputy after he boldly denounced the armed forces for "inefficiency, corruption, and political meddling".

In 1949, he was among founding members of the National Front. A staunch supporter of Mohammad Mosaddegh, he was elected to the 17th term of parliament as a senior Iran Party member, again from his hometown. During his tenure, he served as the deputy speaker, as well as the head of National Front's parliamentary group.

== Exile and death ==
After the 1953 coup d'état he was arrested and sentenced to life imprisonment, however he was released and permitted to go to exile. He died in 1971.

Party political offices
Unknown Last known title holder: Mohammad Mosaddegh	Head of the National Movement fraction 1952–1953	Vacant
