= League of Iranian Socialists =

- Leader: Reza Shayan
- Secretary: Amir Pishdad
- Founder: Khalil Maleki
- Founded: 1960
- Dissolved: 1980s
- Merger of: Third Force
- Ideology: Islamic socialism Social democracy Iranian nationalism Left-wing nationalism
- Political position: Left-wing
- National affiliation: National Front (1960–1979); National Democratic Front (1979–1981)
- International affiliation: Socialist International

League of Socialists of the National Movement of Iran (Persian: جامعه سوسیالیست‌های نهضت ملی ایران, romanized: Jāmeʿa-ye sōsīalīsthā-ye nahżat-e mellī-e Īrān) or League of Iranian Socialists (Persian: جامعه سوسیالیست‌های ایران, romanized: Jāmeʿa-ye sōsīalīsthā-ye Īrān) was a socialist nationalist party in Iran.

The party formally joined the Socialist International upon establishment.

It was founded in 1960 by Third Force activists led by Khalil Maleki and a number of radical nationalists, most of whom had social democracy leanings and some members with Islamic socialism tendencies. Hossein Malek, Ahmad Sayyed Javadi and Jalal Al-e-Ahmad were among people associated with the group.

The organization was a founding member of the National Front (II) and was considered the "extereme left-wing" within the front. It broke with the front and joined the National Democratic Front after the Iranian Revolution. In the 1980 Iranian presidential election, the group supported People's Mujahedin of Iran nominee Massoud Rajavi.
