= Hootan Dolati =

Iranian political activist and member of the Iran's National Front

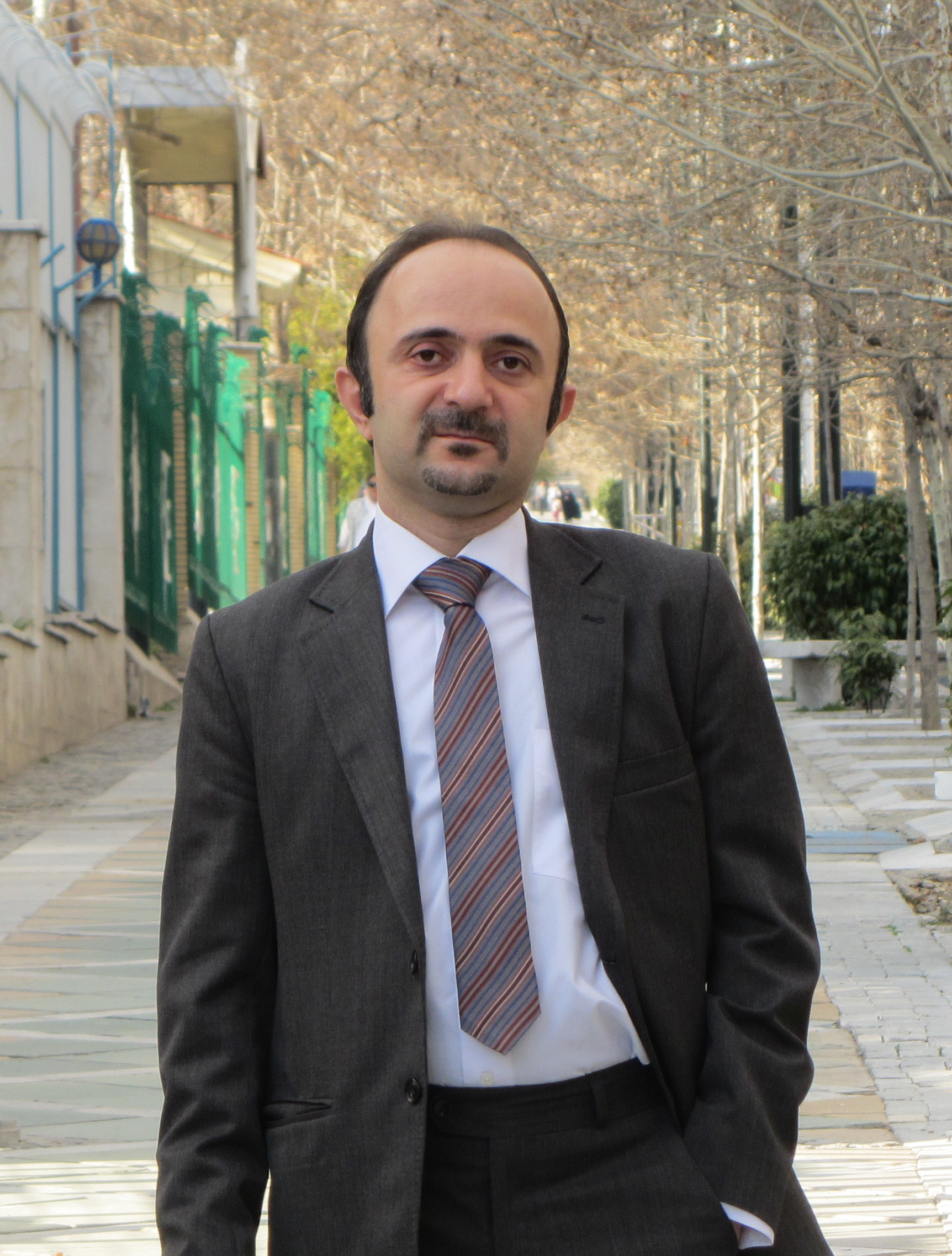
- Dolati in 2017
- Born: 4 February 1977 (age 49); Tehran, Iran
- Political party: National Front

Hootan Dolati (Persian: هوتن دولتی; born 4 February 1977 in Tehran, Iran) is a political activist and member of the Iran's National Front. He was in Evin Prison for a year and a half.

== Biography ==
He is an ethnic Talysh. Prior to his arrest by the Iranian government Dolati worked as an engineer and as a journalist.

== Imprisonment ==
On March 15, 2013 Dolati was arrested on the charges of "Propaganda Against the State" and "Membership in a Banned Group". His sentence was one and a half years in prison, and a five-year ban on membership in any political party or social group.

Dolati has been repeatedly denied medical treatment by the clinic in Tehran's Evin Prison. He has been on hunger strike since 28 November 2013, in protest at being denied medical care for his chronic heart condition.

Dolati was released on 6 September 2014.

== See also ==
- Human rights in Iran
- National Front (Iran)
