= Third Force (Iran) =

- Leader: Khalil Maleki
- Founded: 1948
- Dissolved: 1960
- Split from: Tudeh Party (1948); Toilers Party (1952)
- Merged into: Toilers Party (1951); League of Socialists (1960)
- Newspaper: ʿElm o Zendegi
- Ideology: Democratic socialism Iranian nationalism Titoism; Third-Worldism; Anti-imperialism
- Political position: Left-wing
- National affiliation: National Front

Third Force (Persian: نیروی سوم, romanized: Niru-ye sevvom) was a loosely organized non-aligned political movement in Iran which advocated an independent, socialist–nationalist philosophy of development. Though not a modern party, it maintained organization within activists and press. It did not become an important party, however made an enormous impact on Iranian democracy struggle after 1953 Iranian coup d'état.

The group was established in 1948 as a breakaway split from the communist Tudeh Party of Iran, when they rejected the party's Stalinism and pro-soviet oil concession stance in favor of democratic socialism and centrist Marxism, supporting nationalization of the Iran oil industry movement. They backed National Front and in 1951, joined socialist Toilers Party of the Iranian Nation, led by Mozzafar Baghai. Third Force split from the party in October 1952, after they positioned against Government of Mosaddegh.

According to leader Khalil Maleki, the group functioned through two basic principles, being a "Third Force in general", meaning to pursue an independent path from Western and Eastern blocs; and a "Third Force in particular", i.e. application of the third way in local circumstances.

In 1960, it was merged into the League of Socialists of the National Movement of Iran.
