= Khalil Maleki =

Iranian political figure (1901–1969)

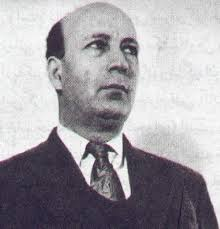
- Born: 1901; Tabriz, Sublime State of Persia
- Died: 13 July 1969 (aged 67–68); Tehran, Pahlavi Iran
- Political party: League of Socialists (1960–69); Toilers Party (1951–52); Third Force (1948–51; 1952–60); Tudeh Party (1944–48)

Khalil Maleki (Persian: خلیل ملکی; 1901–1969) was an Iranian socialist political figure and intellectual affiliated with the National Front.

== Political career and activities ==
During the early 1940s, Maleki was one of 53 left-wing intellectuals who had been imprisoned by Reza Shah. After his release, he was one of the original founders of the Tudeh Party (i.e. party of the masses), a communist and pro-Soviet organization that desired to transform Iran into a socialist state modeled on that of the Soviet Union. The group played a significant role in organizing labor unrest and pushing for improved wages and living conditions for the working class of Iran, particularly those working in the oil fields of Khuzestan (then under the control of the Anglo-Iranian Oil Company or AIOC). But the party was widely believed to be taking its orders from Soviet leader Joseph Stalin and because of this, many Iranians regarded them as traitors. In time, Maleki came to believe that the Tudeh Party was a proxy force of the USSR and for this reason he broke off from the group and began to denounce them. Along with Dr. Mozzafar Baghai, he helped to create the Toilers Party of Iran, an organization ostensibly dedicated to establishing socialism and democracy in Iran which rallied to the cause of oil nationalization, but which was also very anti-communist.

In contrast to the Tudeh Party, Maleki argued that Iran should be independent of both the West (i.e. Great Britain) and East (Soviet Union). However, in 1952, Maleki broke with Baghai over the latter's decision to turn against the government of Dr. Mohammad Mossadegh, who was at this time the prime minister and leader of Iran. Premier Mossadegh had led the movement to nationalize the oil industry (bringing it under the control of the National Iranian Oil Company or NIOC) in 1951. Since that time, he had taken measures to democratize Iran and bring about modest reforms in administrative areas, in the military and in the conduct of elections. However, Baghai argued that Mossadegh was showing excessive tolerance towards the communists and that his policies were too collectivistic in nature. He then split off from the National Front of Iran (an umbrella group of parties who all supported Prime Minister Mossadegh). Because of this, the Toilers Party split into two factions, with one side joining with Baghai in opposing Mossadegh and the other joining with Khalil Maleki in his support for Mossadegh's policies. This latter group became known as the Third Force and it was the dominant left-wing element in the National Front.

On 19 August 1953, the pro-Shah elements in the Iranian military replaced Mossadegh with an autocratic monarchy led by the reigning king, Mohammad Reza Shah. Khalil Maleki, along with other nationalists, strongly opposed the new, despotic and pro-West regime and he continued his political activity throughout the 1950s and 1960s. But in the early 1960s, during the formation of the Second National Front, he was prohibited from joining that group due to the strong resistance he encountered from Shapour Bakhtiar and Mohammad Ali Khonji. Nevertheless, he joined with the Third National Front and remained politically active until his death in 1969.

Maleki was a Marxist, and, as noted, a former Communist. He was one of the first, if not the first, world Communist leader to reject Stalin's leadership after World War II. Instead, throughout the 1950s and 1960s, he identified with democratic socialism, and the non-aligned movement. Third Force party offices prominently displayed a picture of Jawaharlal Nehru, with whom Maleki identified politically. Maleki hoped for peaceful change through elections in Iran, but the Shah's repression in the late 1960s doomed those hopes. The Third Force has been described as prefiguring the third-worldism of the Bandung Conference. However, Maleki would also go on to defend the state of Israel and particularly its Mapai party, setting him aside from anti-imperialist leftists who rejected Zionism altogether.

== Other sources ==
- Siavoshi, Sussan, Liberal Nationalism in Iran: The Failure of a Movement, Westview Press, March 1990.
