= Seyed Hossein Mousavian (physician) =

Iranian physician and political activist

Hossein Mousavian
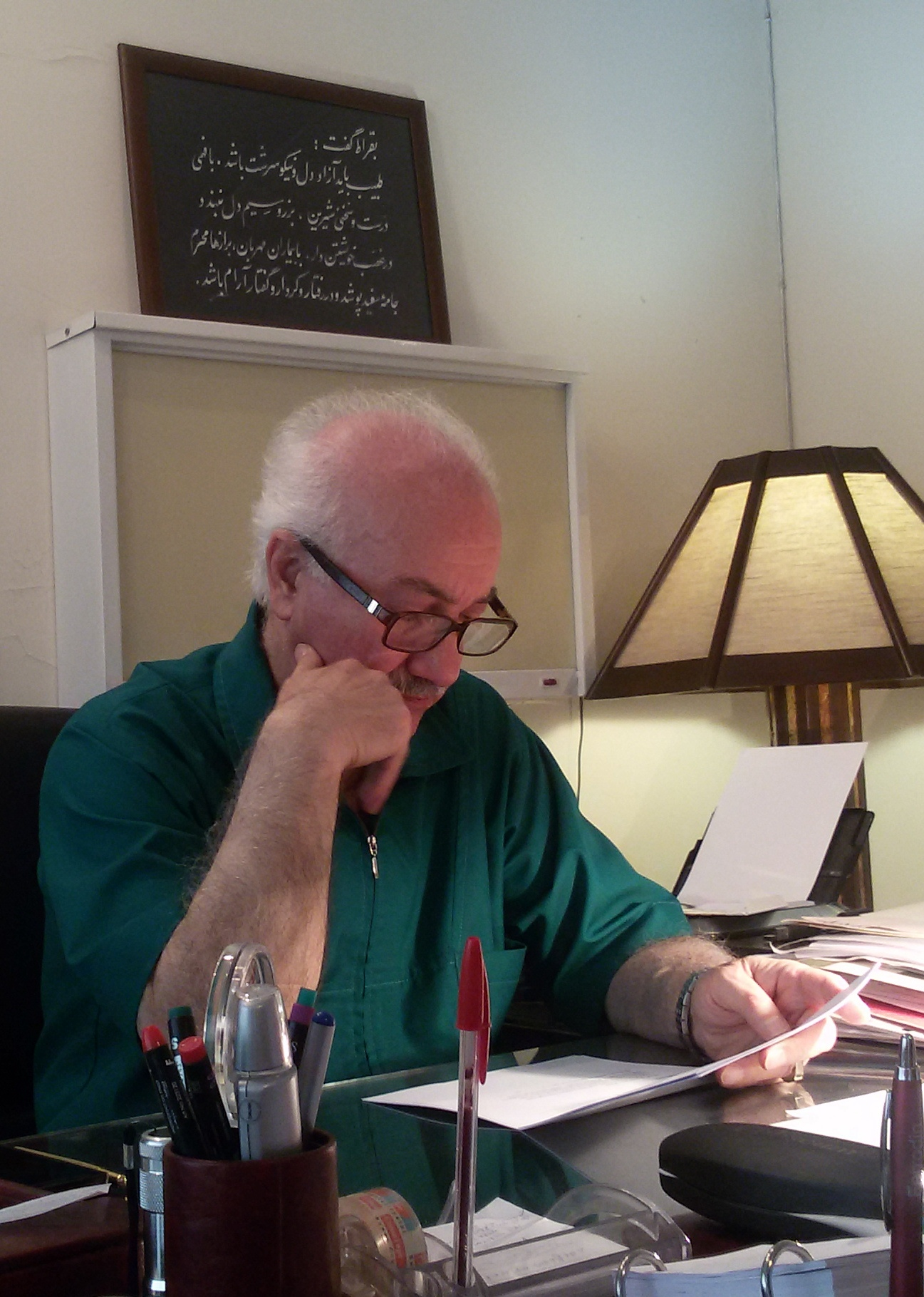
- Mousavian in 2016
- Born: 1941 (age 84–85); Tehran, Imperial State of Iran
- Education: Tehran University of Medical Sciences
- Political party: National Front

Seyed Hossein Mousavian (Persian: سید حسین موسویان; born 1941 in Tehran) is an Iranian physician and political activist affiliated with the National Front. He currently serves as the party's chairman.

Party political offices
Vacant Title last held by Adib Boroumand	Leader of the National Front; 2018–	Incumbent
