= Mozzafar Baghai =

Iranian politician (1912-1987)

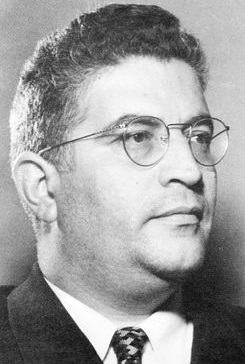

Member of Parliament
- In office 27 April 1952 – 16 August 1953
- Constituency: Tehran
- In office 25 April 1950 – 19 February 1952
- Constituency: Tehran
- In office 12 June 1947 – 28 July 1949 Serving with Ahmad Razavi
- Constituency: Kerman

Personal details
- Born: 23 July 1912 Kerman, Persia
- Died: 18 November 1987 (aged 75) Tehran, Iran
- Party: Toilers Party (1951–1981); Democrat Party (1946–1948); National Union Party (1944–1946)
- Other political affiliations: National Front (1949–1952)

Mozzafar Baghai (Persian: مظفر بقائی, alternatively rendered as Baqa'i; 23 July 1912 – 18 November 1987) was an Iranian political figure who was most prominent during the 1940s and 1950s. He founded the Toilers Party of the Iranian Nation along with Khalil Maleki. In the period leading up to the 1953 coup, Baghai played a key role in destabilizing the government of Mohammad Mosaddegh and was personally implied in the abduction and murder of Mosaddegh's police chief Mahmoud Afshartous.

== Political career ==
Baghai rose to prominence during the national struggle against British control of Iran's oil industry. For decades, most Iranians had resented the Anglo-Iranian Oil Company (51% of which was under the control of the British government) for the perceived injustice of allocating most profits to the company and the British government, while only a very small proportion was given to Iran, despite the fact that the oil fields were on Iranian territory. Baghai made himself known as a fiery critic of the British and he allied himself with those of like mind, including Dr. Mohammad Mossadegh (a man who had risen to prominence as a fierce critic of Reza Shah, the despotic ruler of Iran from 1921 to 1941, and of the British control of the oil fields and that country's interference in Iran's internal affairs).

Baghai was different from many other nationalists in that he held very left-wing (albeit anti-communist) views. He was able to best articulate this when he formed the Toilers Party of the Iranian Nation, a left-wing, nationalistic and anti-communist party that included such notables as Khalil Maleki (an ex-member of the Tudeh Party who broke away from that group for its dependence on the Soviet Union). In 1949, the Toilers Party joined with Mossadegh and his liberal supporters in forming the National Front of Iran, which was an umbrella organization for all Iranians who were committed to the principles of freeing Iran from foreign domination, ending arbitrary rule and establishing a government dependent on the will of the people of Iran. In April 1951, one month after the oil industry was nationalized by the Majlis, Mossadegh was chosen by that elected body as the Prime Minister of Iran, subject to approval by the reigning Mohammad Reza Shah (who had succeeded his father as Shah of Iran in Sept. 1941).

Until 1952, Baghai stood by Mossadegh in his struggle against the United Kingdom and his intensifying dispute in Iran with the pro-Shah elements, who had opposed Mossadegh's style of governing and his policies vis-a-vis the UK. From 1952 to 1953, Bagai served in the seventeenth Majlis, from which he initially used to support Mossadegh's government. But by late 1952, Baghai had become disillusioned with Mossadegh, pulling his Toilers Party out of the National Front and siding with the pro-Shah elements, who were present in the Majlis, military, press, royal court and other institutions. In taking this course, Baghai split with Khalil Maleki, who remained loyal to Mossadegh and formed his own group called the Third Force. Baghai subsequently tried to conspire against the Mossadegh government with Fazlollah Zahedi in the autumn of 1952. Although the conspiracy was exposed, he was not arrested because he enjoyed parliamentary immunity. Going even further, Baghai (along with Zahedi and Hossein Khatibi) worked to organize the April 1953 abduction and killing of Mossadegh's police chief Mahmoud Afshartous. On 19 August 1953, the CIA and MI6 sponsored a coup d'état against Mossadegh which succeeded in toppling his government and restoring the monarchy to Iran. Due to his role in bringing down Mossadegh, Baghai was at the time shunned by the ex-premier's colleagues and the Iranian public (most of whom had remained sympathetic to Mossadegh and his role in fighting imperialism abroad and despotism at home).

After a long period of relative obscurity, Baghai again became somewhat involved in Iranian politics after the 1979 toppling of the Shah. However, he was arrested and imprisoned by the new Khomeini regime. He died in 1987 during his imprisonment, "under very suspicious circumstances".

== See also ==
- Abadan Crisis
- Mahmoud Afshartous

== Sources ==
Party political offices
New title Party founded	Leader of the Toilers Party of the Iranian Nation; 1951–1981	Party dissolved
