= Asghar Parsa =

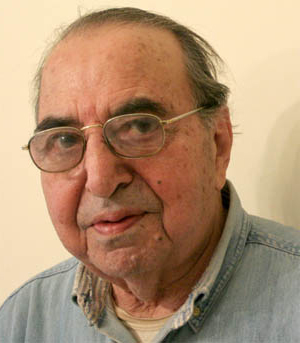
- Parsa in 2007

Member of the Parliament of Iran
- In office 23 July 1952 – 2 August 1953
- Constituency: Khoy

Personal details
- Born: 1919 Khoy, Iran
- Died: 5 February 2007 (aged: 88) Tehran, Iran
- Party: National Front
- Spouse: Parvin Ghadimi
- Children: Ali
- Education: University of Tehran

Asghar Parsa (Persian: اصغر پارسا; 1919-2007) was a prominent member of Iran's National Front.

After graduating from Tehran University's School of Law, he served in the Ministry of Foreign Affairs. He was elected to Majlis from Khoy in 1951. He sided with Mohammed Mosaddeq and was arrested after the 1953 Iranian coup d'état of August 19.

In 1960, he was the spokesperson of the National Front, before being imprisoned again in 1962.

After the 1979 Iranian Revolution, he was Editor-in-Chief of the National Front's newspaper. He was imprisoned again for more than three years by the government.

He died February 2007 in Tehran.

Party political offices
| Preceded by Dariush Forouhar | Spokesperson of the National Front; 1979–1997 | Succeeded by Hassan Lebaschi |
| Unknown | Spokesperson of the National Movement fraction 1952–1953 | Vacant |
