= Toilers Party of the Iranian Nation =

Toilers Party حزب زحمتکشان ملت ایران
- Leader: Mozzafar Baghai
- Founder: Mozzafar Baghai and Khalil Maleki
- Founded: 16 May 1951
- Dissolved: 1981
- Merger of: Third Force and Organization for the Protection of Freedom
- Newspaper: Shahed ʿAttar
- Membership: ~ 5,000 (1951); ~ 100 (1967)
- Ideology: Socialism (Iranian); Social democracy Anti-communism; Anti-imperialism
- Political position: Left-wing
- National affiliation: National Front (1951–1952)

The Toilers Party of the Iranian Nation (Persian: حزب زحمتکشان ملت ایران, romanized: Ḥezb-e Zaḥmatkašān-e Mellat-e Īrān; Zaḥmatkašān means proletariat) was a social-democratic political party in Iran.

Initially a member of the National Front, they pledged support for the nationalization of the Iran oil industry and opposed Tudeh Party.

They successfully attracted a considerable amount of educated youth (especially in the University of Tehran), Third Force activists and shopkeepers from Kerman in bazzar. Yet the party also included a nucleus of čāqukeš and čumāqdār.

In the 1952 legislative election, the party won two seats by Baghai and Ali Zohari.

The party split in 1952 over its relationship with Government of Mosaddegh. Under leadership of Mozzafar Baghai, Toilers left National Front and openly opposed the government while Khalil Maleki reestablished Third Force under the name of Toilers Party of the Iranian Nation — Third Force and continued to support the government.

Toilers formed an alliance with Society of Mujahed Muslims, led by Ayatollah Kashani, pooling their resources and coordinating their activities against government. They actively participated in the 1953 coup d'état and called it a "national uprising", however opposed Fazlollah Zahedi's post-coup military government. Following their opposition, their newspapers was banned and their party office was confiscated by the government and the party went on a hiatus until 1960 Iranian legislative election. They resumed activity in 1961 and expressed support for Ayatollah Khomeini in 5 June 1963 demonstrations.

In 1971, the party was reorganized with the permission of the government, but was forced to cease its activities in 1975 after the announcement of one-party state under Resurgence Party. In 1977, Baghai made an attempt to revive the party after declaring loyalty to the Pahlavi dynasty, albeit at restricted level.

In 1979 Islamic Republic referendum the party policy was to vote "Yes". It was soon after dissolved after the revolution.
