= Lashkar-nevis =

Rank in Qajar Iran

Lashkar-nevis (Persian: لشكرنويس, lit. 'army scribe') was in Qajar Iran (1789–1925), the manager of the muster of the royal and imperial troops and a military office. Reza Shah of the Pahlavi dynasty abolished this post when he overtook power and reorganisated the military and governmental system.

== History ==
From the very beginning the Qajar central government was divided into an administrative part (divan) and the army (lashkar), both housed in the citadel (arg) of Tehran. Therefore, the ministry of army (vezarat-e lashkar), later ministry of war (vezarat-e jang) needed an own administration. After the reforms of army (nezam-e jadid, lit. "New Orderly Army") introduced by crown prince Abbas Mirza in 1828, and continued by Nasser al-Din Shah during the second half of the 19th century, the government needed scribes, clerks and civil servants to write and copy lists about tax, salary, material stuff and recruiting. Head of all these clerks in army service was the lashkar-nevis (lit. "army scribe"). This governmental post did exist since Safavid time and based on the medieval Islamic official of Arez (from Arabic araza, "to lay open to view," i.e. inspection), who had charge of the administrative side of the military forces, being especially concerned with payment, recruitment, training, and inspection.

During Nasser al-Din Shah's reign in the course of the 19th century a gradual institutionalization of bureaucratic positions took place and helped to raise the relative status of these "men of the pen" (ahl-e qalam) to that of the "men of the sword" (ahl-e seyf). By this fashion, major lashkar-nevises were given honorific titles equivalent to those of high-ranking military officers. During the Qajar era at the end of the 19th and beginning of the 20th century the office of Lashkar-nevis bashi (Head Lashkar-nevis) was held by two generations of a family coming from Shiraz, later known as Rafat or Jalai: Haji Mirza Fatullah Shuja ul Mulk, Mirza Abul Qasim Khan (son of the former) and Mirza Ahmad Khan Jala ul Mulk (grandson of the Shuja ul Mulk and nephew and son-in-law of Mirza Abul Qasim).

== Duties ==
The Lashkar-nevis-bashi (Chief Lashkar-nevis) was the chief muster-master of the royal troops, and as the army's paymaster-general, finally, he was head of the whole military administration apparatus in Qajar time. Under Agha Mohammad Khan the Lashkar-nevis was responsible for the recruitment, arrangement, logistics and supply of the whole army; thus combined many of the duties of a modern war minister, paymaster-general, and quartermaster-general. When the administrative apparatus increased the head of the army was the minister of army (vazir-e lashkar) who later was called minister of war (vazir-e jang) and who hold the de facto title of commander-in-chief. The second man in line was the vazir-e daftar-e lashkar-nevis as comptroller of the army, who was in charge of the army's budget. In this ministry of Daftar-e lashkar-nevis the Lashkar-nevis was responsible to draw up the annual budget of the regiments. Finally, he became the central dignitary of military logistics; as the army's chief caterer and paymaster he was in charge for the salary of every army member (asaker), which included not only military persons but court servants and provincial officials, too. Therefore, the Lashkar-nevis supervised a staff of recruitment clerks of seven scribes and secretaries (moshref) responsible for the exact accountancy of the troops' supply unit in men and feed. These men were in charge of the muster rolls and recording who was present or not. The different recruitment officials were based in the emarat-e nezam (lit. "Edifice of Army", i.e. military headquarter), and the rais-e daftar-e lashkar was chief of the provincial army secretariat, while the mostowfi-ye nezam was the revenue officer of the army. Also, it was the lashkar-nevis of the area in question who set the system of recruitment clerks under his jurisdiction and to see that his regiment obtained the funds it had been allotted, as well as the rations necessary when it was on active duty. Finally all local reports were checked and collected by a head Lashkar-nevis, called Lashkar-nevis-bashi. He then submitted an annual report of all transactions of the army in his domain to the vazir-e lashkar, who presented his ministry's budget to the ministry of finance. There the costs were written down into the budget cost register (ketabchaneh-ye dastur-e al-'amal).

=== Army Recruitment Organisation ===
The Persian army traditionally consisted of a tribal cavalry force (rekabi) and an infantry unit mostly made of militia volunteers (cherik), which was recruited when it was necessary by the local governors. The central government recruited soldiers for infantry and artillery (tofanghchi va toupchi) from the provinces based on the amount of taxation from each area. This military tax (bonicheh-ye sarbaz) was introduced as a replacement for the old system of tribal levies by Prime Minister Mirza Taqi Khan "Amir Kabir" in about 1850, based on earlier reforms of Abbas Mirza, and legalized in the recruitment law (qanun-e sarbaziri) of 2 November 1915 by the Persian parliament (majles). Under the bonicheh-ye sarbaz system each village, district, or tribe was required to provide a number of recruits proportional to the amount of its revenue assessment. As with the agricultural bonicheh taxation system, set according to the fertility and running costs of farmland, the base for calculation differed in different areas; it could be amount of land under cultivation, available amount of water, population, or number of animals owned by a tribal group. Theoretically one recruit had to be provided for every unit of revenue, which could range from 12 to 20 Toumans. The recruits only were taken from parts of Iran popular for the best soldiers like Astarabad, Azerbaijan, Khorassan, Kordestān, Mazanderan, Qazvin, Sistan and Zarijan. The southern provinces of Fars and Kerman often were added to these areas of military tax system. In order to offset the resulting imbalance in the tax burden on different provinces, the government reduced the level of cash revenues required from those liable to bonicheh-ye sarbaz and correspondingly increased them for those that were exempt. Land owned by princes, great proprietors, notables, and religious leaders was exempt from this taxation, as was that belonging to Christians, Jews, and Zoroastrians, to whom different tax regulations were applied. Also no land tax was levied in the towns, and their inhabitants were exempt, as were peasants living on crown lands.

According to the law, one of every ten men in a village was to be taken for military service; he was supposed to be a padar (taxpayer), an owner of land or cattle. If a man from the same village who was not a padar volunteered for military service, the community had to provide him with funds for during his period of service. So, the army paid the soldier's way to the training camp (where he was drilled a couple of hours per day) and his salary and fodder (hoquq o jireh), during the six-month period in which he was under arms each year. During the other six months he was supposed to be on half-payfrom the provincial budget, estimated on an annual basis, which was entered separately in the budget (dastar al-amal) of each province under the heading shesh-maha-ye mahall ("local six months' salary tax"). With this system the number of recruits needed from each province was calculated by the clerks for the annual provincial budget.

The basic training was about a year and the recruited soldier had to be ready to serve about two to four years. Soldiers in service enjoyed only the usufruct of their property; the government held the property itself as security for military equipment and to prevent desertions. In order to support the recruited soldier's family in his absence, either the village as a whole or the remaining nine men of the base group had to pay an annual subvention, called khanvari ("home allowance"). The khanvari was either paid directly to the soldier's family or collected by the government, which was supposed to pass it on to the soldier. Its amount was paid in kind or cash or a combination of both, and was apparently fixed by the interested parties themselves without interference from the authorities; it thus differed greatly from area to area. In cities like Tehran and Tabriz it was 5 and 12 Toumans; in provincial towns like Ardabil 1.5, Qazvin 3 and Urmiyeh 5 Toumans; and in tribal districts like Khalkhal 1, Qaraghan 1.5, Shaqaqi 10 and Qaradaghi 16 Toumans. In some parts of the country, when an infantry or artillery recruit had to join his regiment, the owner of his village (saheb-e bonicheh) or the local peasant proprietors (khorda mallek) had to give him or his family a bounty for support in his absence. It was known as komak-e kharj ("expense allowance") or padarana ("allowance"), the amount varying from 5 to 40 Toumans in cash or kind. Although the khanvari was paid every year, the padarana was paid only once. Some regiments, however, including all cavalry regiments, did not have the right of khanvari, because they were funded and paid by their tribes, called only in case of war and did not receive money while on leave at home.

The bonicheh-ye sarbaz was collected by a recruitment sergeant (often a large landed proprietor or chief of the district), accompanied by several of his officers and an accountant (mostowfi), touring the villages that were liable for recruits. The regulations stipulated the religion, age, height, and health conditions of prospective recruits. The village elders (rish-sefid) would already have selected those ready for military service. The sergeant would select from among them the most suitable, rejecting the unfit. Richer families paid for exemption from military service. Villages that could not deliver their assessed quotas were in practice reduced to levels reflecting their economic situation. Finally the taxation results were given to the government officials and the lashkar-nevis in charge of that region checked all the revenues. Like the alphabetical taxation list he had a master list with all recruits and their costs appropriate to the provincial divisions, and for each province there was a military tax register (ketabcheh-ye bonicheh) in which the method of calculating the tax was stipulated. The chief lashkar-nevis headed finally all the lashkar-nevis of the different areas of Persia and was answerable only to the minister of army (vazir-e lashkar).

It was common for some regiments to reach only half or three-quarters of their strength on paper, though payment from the Treasury for the full number was collected. Also, the officers of the regiment were entitled to a share of the soldiers' wages; as they also often appropriated the padarana, and sometimes soldiers were even forced to work in the cities in order to earn their livelihoods. To avoid that the governmental rations would become only a source of income for the local recruiting sergeant, and to secure the right running of recruitment and training, regular inspections took place by the regimental colonel visiting the different units to report the central government about the troop's actual condition and orderly day's life in the headquarters. Periodical parades and camps held by the shah completed these inspections.

=== Army Budget ===
With this recruitment system the central government had about 100,000 infantrymen, 30,000 cavalrymen and several units of artillery under its command, including the royal guards, musketeers, footmen and the shah's private household staff. The reports of the Lashkar-nevis documented all costs and vouchers of payment of the entire soldiery of 200,000, which amounted to one-third of the whole annual fiscal expenditure in the time of Nasser al-Din Shah.

According to the number of recruits, soldiers and officers the army budget and financing the armed forces was set. Each regiment had a regular (thabet) and an incidental (gheir thabet) budget. The soldiers on duty or official leave during their six-month period per year were paid out of the regular budget. The officers got their funds in cash or kind from the provincial revenue officer the regiment was stationed. Thus they were paid by the provincial government, which got an extra salary for these costs from the ministry of finance. When the army was on operations the costs were paid from the incidental budget. These payments again were paid in cash or kind.

All soldiers were equipped with modern European weapons, munitions and short westernized uniforms. Only at ceremonial occasions the high-ranking officials still wore the traditional long uniforms consisting of a long cashmere robe, a wide cummerbund and a high hat (often a length of embroidered cashmere shawl wrapped around the common felt skull cap). Red felt pantaloons and flat slippers completed this formal attire.

== Literature ==
- Ashraf, Ahmad/ Ali Banuazizi: "Class System, v. Classes in the Qajar Period" in: Encyclopaedia Iranica, Vol. V, edit. by Ehsan Yarshater, Mazda Publishers, Costa Mesa 1992, pp. 667–677.
- Bakhash, Shaul: "Administration in Iran, i. The Safavid, Zand, and Qajar Periods", in: Encyclopaedia Iranica, Vol. I, edit. by Ehsan Yarshater, Routledge & Kegan Paul, London, Boston and Henly 1985, pp. 462–466.
- Bosworth, Edmond: "'Āreż", in: Encyclopaedia Iranica, Vol. III, edit. by Ehsan Yarshater, Routledge & Kegan Paul, London and Boston 1989.
- Floor, Willem: "Bonīča", in: Encyclopædia Iranica, Vol. IV, edit. by Ehsan Yarshater, Routledge & Kegan Paul, London and New York 1990.
- Floor, Willem: A Fiscal History of Iran in the Safavid and Qajar Periods, Persian Studies Series, No. 7 – Bibliotheca Persica Press, New York 1998.
- Fragner, Bert Georg: Memoirenliteratur als Quelle zur neueren Geschichte Iran, Franz Steiner Verlag (Freiburger Islamstudien, 7), Wiesbaden 1979.
- Mostofi, Abdollah: The Administrative and Social History of the Qajar Period, Vol. I, Mazda Publishers, Costa Mesa 1997.
