= National Front (Iran) =

Opposition political party in Iran

National Front جبهه‌ ملی ایران
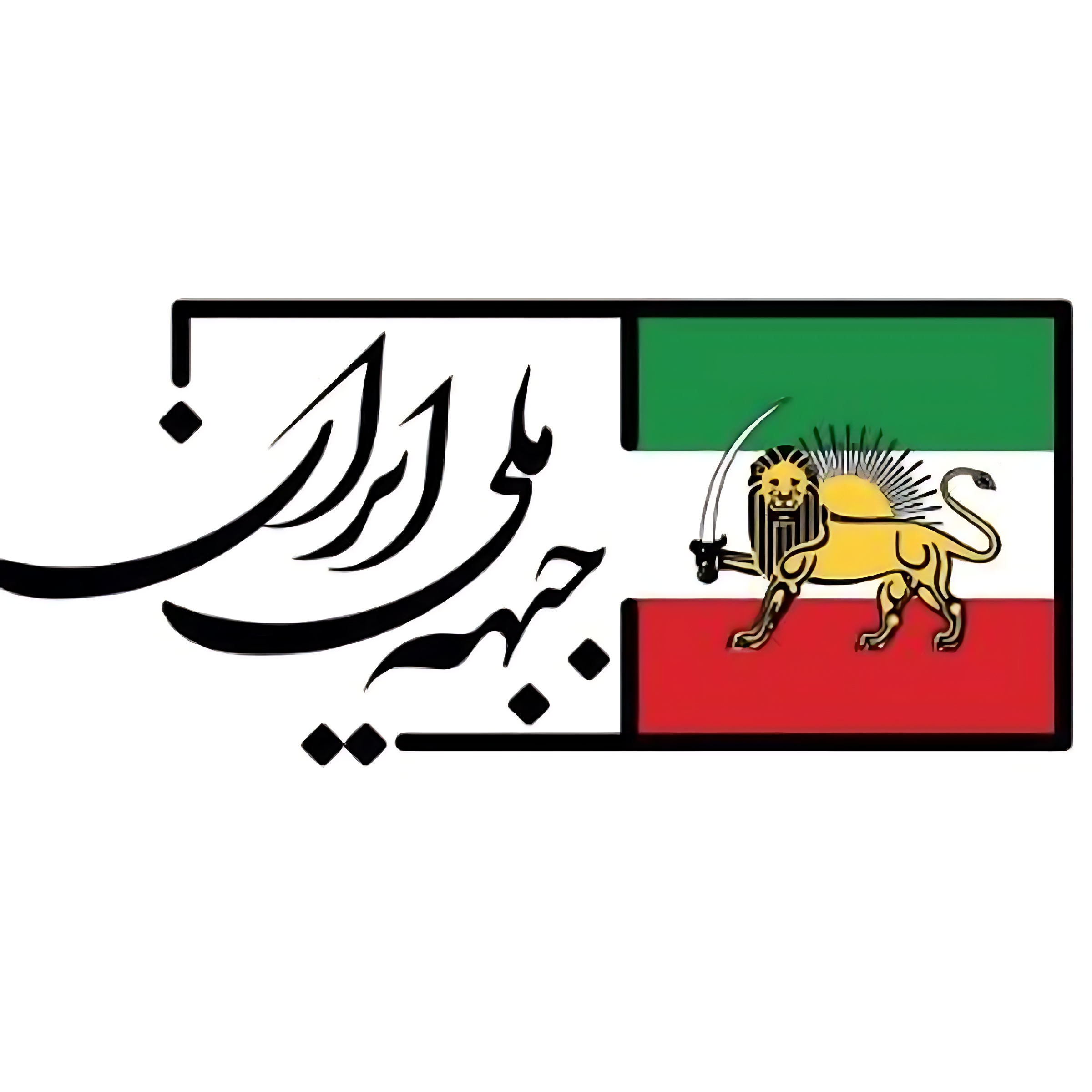
- Chairperson: Seyed Hossein Mousavian
- Spokesperson: Mohsen Frashad
- Founder: Mohammad Mosaddegh
- Founded: 12 November 1949 (original); 14 July 1960 (second); 29 July 1965 (third); 12 June 1977 (fourth); 1993 (current)
- Headquarters: Tehran
- Parliamentary wing: National Movement fraction (1950–1953)
- Ideology: Mosaddeghism; Liberalism (Iranian); Democracy; Secular liberalism; Civic nationalism; Anti-imperialism; Social democracy; Republicanism; Historical factions: • Socialism (Iranian); • Islamic liberalism; • Conservative liberalism; • Pan-Iranism
- Political position: Centre-left (majority)
- Parliament: 0 / 290

Party flag

Website
- jebhemeliiran.org

The National Front of Iran (Persian: جبهه‌ ملی ایران, romanized: Jebhe-ye Melli-ye Irân) is an opposition political organization in Iran. Founded in 1949 by Mohammad Mosaddegh, it is the country's oldest—and arguably largest—pro-democracy group operating inside Iran, although it has never regained the prominence it enjoyed in the early 1950s.

Initially, the National Front was an umbrella organization for a broad coalition of forces with nationalist, liberal-democratic, socialist, bazaari, secular and Islamic tendencies, that mobilized to successfully campaign for the nationalization of the Iranian oil industry. In 1951, the National Front formed a government which was deposed by the 1953 Iranian coup d'état and subsequently repressed. Members attempted to revive the National Front in 1960, 1965, and 1977.

Before 1953 and throughout the 1960s, the National Front was torn by strife between secular and religious elements. Over time its coalition split into various squabbling factions, with the National Front gradually emerging as the leading organization of secular liberals with nationalist members adhering to liberal democracy and social democracy.

During the Iranian Revolution, the Front supported the overthrow of the monarchy and its replacement with an Islamic Republic. In the early years of the post-revolutionary government, it served as the primary symbol of the nationalist movement. It was banned in July 1981. Although it is under constant surveillance and officially illegal, it remains active inside Iran.

== Background ==
The establishment of the National Front followed the deposition of Reza Shah after the Anglo-Soviet invasion of Iran. While the invasion caused much social and political suffering in Iran, it liberated Iran from the yoke of Reza Shah's dictatorship and ushered in a new half-sourced body of constitutional governance under the new Shah, Mohammad Reza Pahlavi, in which the people were more free to express their opinions. Specifically, the removal of Reza Shah from power gave way to freedom of public opinion, the release of political convicts, and the restoration of dignity to those who were excluded during the first Pahlavi period. Through this newfound (relative) freedom, political parties began emerging across the country. Another contributing factor was the temporary absence of a superior political power for a portion of time following Reza Shah's deposition, leading to the creation of various new centers of powers in the country. This was manisfested in part through the creation of diverse political parties. Another consequence of this newfound political landscape was the emergence of Iranian nationalism, consisting of two major factors: the fight against tyranny and internal corruption, and the opposition to foreign interference. The National Front found its origins through these environmental, underlying factors.

== Mossadegh era (1949–1953) ==
The National Front had its roots in a protest against ballot-rigging, where Mohammad Mosaddegh led a peaceful procession from his house to the Marble Palace on 15 October 1949, threatened to take sanctuary in a major mosque or shrine, and was eventually allowed into the palace with 19 other people, where they stayed for four days. The Shah, Mohammad Reza Pahlavi, eventually gave in and promised fair and honest elections. After the sit-in, the leaders of the protest formed the National Front and elected Mossadegh to be its chairman. The National Front was conceived to be a broad alliance of like-minded associations (rather than individuals, as in a normal political party) with the aim of strengthening democracy, press freedom, and constitutional government. The most important groups in the National Front were the Iran Party, the Toilers Party, the National Party, and the Tehran Association of Bazaar Trade and Craft Guilds.

Soon after its founding, the National Front opposed the existing Western domination and control of Iran's natural resources, and related revenues, which began with colonialist concessions during the Qajar era. Since the early 1910s, Iran's oil assets were dominated by the Anglo-Iranian Oil Company (AIOC), whose predecessor company in bought the concession from William Knox D'Arcy. D'Arcy had negotiated the concession in 1901 with Mozaffar ad-Din Shah Qajar, the Shah of Iran, who granted a 60-year petroleum search concession in a transaction in which the only money to change hands was a single personal payment to the Shah by D'Arcy. In truth, the British government owned 51 percent of shares in the AIOC and by 1950, revenue generated by the Abadan Refinery, a staple of the Iranian oil concession, was the British government's single largest overseas investment. Even after acceding to a renegotiated arrangement with the Shah's government in 1933, the AIOC (which later became BP) persistently violated the terms of the concession agreement; even as Iran's movement for nationalization grew in the late 1940s the AIOC remained obstinate. Although AIOC was highly profitable, "its Iranian workers were poorly paid and lived in squalid conditions."

The goal of the National Front was to nationalize Iran's oil resources and to counteract British dominance of Iran's internal affairs by initiating direct relations with the United States. The National Front became the governing coalition when it took office in April 1951, with Mosaddegh elected Prime Minister. Mosaddegh's minister of foreign affairs Hossein Fatemi enforced the "Oil Nationalization Act", passed by the Majlis in March and ratified by the Senate. The Act, reluctantly signed by the Shah, called for nationalization of the assets held by AIOC, from which the government of Iran had hitherto only received minimal compensation. This led to British counter-moves and the loss of nearly all oil incomes for both sides during the Abadan Crisis.

Though nominally supportive of the United Kingdom's position, the United States refused to intervene directly. After Anglo-French efforts to topple Mossadegh's government and restore the status quo only resulted in increased instability and compounded financial loses, the British government again sought American intervention; U.S. President Dwight D. Eisenhower reluctantly authorized the Central Intelligence Agency (CIA) to overthrow the Mossadegh government, in an event known as the 1953 Iranian coup d'état. Prior to the coup, the National Front was made up of four main parties; the Iran Party, which was founded in 1946 as a platform for Iranian liberals, including figures such as Karim Sanjâbi, Gholam Hossein Sadighi, Ahmad Zirakzadeh and Allah-Yar Saleh; the Toilers Party of the Iranian Nation (a left-wing party that advocated a non-communist socialist Iran, led by Mozzafar Baghai and Khalil Maleki); and the Society of Muslim Warriors (an Islamic party led by Âyatollâh Âbol-Ghâsem Kâšâni).

== Second and Third National Front ==
In the aftermath of the 1953 coup, the National Front was outlawed and its highest-ranking leaders arrested and brought before a military court. The military coup established Mohammad Reza Shah as the supreme leader of Iran, although nominal power was held by Prime Minister Fazlollah Zahedi (who was paid by the CIA to help overthrow Mossadegh and strengthen the power of the monarchy). In an atmosphere of police repression, several former members of the National Front (mostly low-ranking leaders) established an underground network called the National Resistance Movement. This group included future prime ministers Mehdi Bazargan and Shapour Bakhtiar, and its aim was to reestablish democracy by campaigning for free and fair elections. Its activities were largely restricted to peacefully distributing flyers and attempting to regulate the 1954 Majlis elections (which in the end were rigged in favor of pro-Shah candidates). It disintegrated under pressure from the state; however, the Second National Front was formed in 1960, which consisted of prominent people such as Karim Sanjabi, Mehdi Bazargan, Allahyar Saleh, Shapour Bakhtiar, Adib Boroumand, Asqar Pârsâ, Dâryuš Foruhar, Qolâm Hosseyn Sadiqi, Mohamad Ali Khonji and others. Its aim was to return Mohammad Mossadegh to the premiership and to reestablish the constitutional monarchy. Initially, it seemed as if this organization was gaining in strength. However, the group's leaders fell into disagreements over questions such as the organization of the Front, tactics against the Shah's regime, and the form of government to which the National Front ought to commit itself. These disputes led to tension between the high-ranking leaders and the student activists; in 1961, Bazargan, Mahmoud Taleghani (a prominent Islamic cleric) and others formed the Freedom Movement of Iran (FMI) which was committed to a democratic state in which the Islamic religion would play a substantial role in state and society (as opposed to the more secular orientation of the National Front).

Another issue arose over the appointment in April 1961 of Dr. Ali Amini to the premiership. It was widely believed that the Shah had chosen Amini under pressure from the Kennedy Administration in the United States; partly for this reason, the National Front's leaders persistently refused to collaborate with or lend support to Amini's government. However, political turmoil grew worse; Amini stepped down from the premiership in 1962, owing to his dispute with the Shah over the former's plans to reduce the military budget. In June the following year, a huge religious uprising occurred in the cities of Tehran, Qom, Mashad, Shiraz, and Varamin, which was put down with ruthless force by the Iranian army. The unrest had been sparked by the arrest of Ayatollah Ruhollah Khomeini, a vocal critic of the Shah and his program of land reforms and granting women the right to vote. Around this time, the Third National Front was formed, which consisted of the FMI (religious-nationalists; Melli-Mazhabis), the Iran Nation Party (the party of Dâryuš Foruhar; Nation Party of Iran), the Society of Iranian Socialists (led by Khalil Maleki, a prominent personality of the Mossadegh era who had been prohibited from joining the Second National Front due to his past history in the Tudeh Party) and the student activists.

The Second and Third National Fronts differed largely in their tactical approach to facing the Shah's regime. The former believed in patiently negotiating with the Shah and the higher officials in the hope of peacefully bringing about a democracy. In contrast to this passive approach, the Third National Front advocated a strategy of civil disobedience and protests in the hope of either forcing the regime to come to terms with the opposition or face collapse. By 1964, however, Mohammad Reza Shah had consolidated his control of both his regime and the country, and he quickly moved to further guarantee his position by increasing the powers of SAVAK (the state's intelligence agency), which was infamous for the torture and killings it inflicted on the opposition and even on ordinary Iranians who merely uttered any wrong words against the regime. In this new atmosphere of police terror, the National Front virtually ceased to exist (though exile branches continued to operate in the United States and Europe).

== Iranian Revolution ==
The National Front was revived in late 1977 by Karim Sanjabi (former minister of education under Mossadegh and now the leader of the Front), Shapour Bakhtiar (former deputy minister of labor under Mosaddegh and now the leader of the Iran Party) and Dâryuš Foruhar (head of the Iran Nation Party). The three signed an open letter which politely criticized the Shah and called on him to re-establish the constitutional monarchy, free political prisoners, respect freedom of speech, and hold free and fair elections. For some months (under pressure from the Carter Administration), many educated and liberal-minded Iranians were now able to voice their grievances against the regime of the Shah.

In January 1978, violence erupted in Qom over the publication of an article in a pro-government newspaper which attacked Ayatollah Ruhollah Khomeini as a British agent and a reactionary. Despite the threatening existence of SAVAK and the harsh crackdown unleashed by the regime on the protesters, the unrest grew and spread to other cities such as Tabriz, which was rocked by riots and briefly seized by rebels. By late 1978, almost the whole country (not just the organized opposition) was inflamed with hatred towards the Shah and rioting, protests and street clashes with the police and army grew in intensity and bloodshed. By this time, Ayatollah Khomeini was now recognized as the undisputed spiritual leader of the uprising. Sanjabi, as representative of the Front, came to Paris, and emerged from his meeting with Khomeini "with a short declaration that spoke of both Islam and democracy as basic principles," and committed the National Front to the twin goals of abolishing the monarchy and establishing a democratic and Islamic government in its place.

This was a diversion from the National Front's long-held aim of reforming the monarchy, and it caused some friction in the high council (although most of the rank and file and leaders supported the new orientation). The friction blew into open division when Shapour Bakhtiar, one of the three top leaders, accepted the Shah's invitation to become the prime minister of Iran, but only on the condition that the Shah committed himself to reign and not rule. Bakhtiar's decision to collaborate with the Shah caused the National Front to denounce him as a traitor to their cause and to expel him from the organization. Only a few moderate and secular individuals among the leadership chose to ally with Bakhtiar and with the monarchy.

On 16 January, the Shah left the country, amid rejoicing among the populace, and on 11 February, the regime collapsed and Ayatollah Khomeini became the political leader of Iran. At first the National Front supported the new Provisional Revolutionary Government and the establishment of the Islamic Republic. But the joint statement with Sanjabi notwithstanding, Khomeini "explicitly refused to put the same word, democracy, into either the title of the Republic or its constitution." Within a short time, it became clear that Ayatollah Khomeini's model of an Islamic society was modeled not on democracy, but on theocratic rule of Islamic jurists (or velayat-e faqih), and traditional Islamic sharia law.

=== 1981 suppression ===
On 15 June 1981, the National Front and other secular opposition groups publicly criticized The Qisas Bill to Islamify the criminal justice system. The bill outlined and codified penalties for various religious offenses, including stoning for adultery (zena), the death penalty for same-sex relations (lavat or mosahegheh), flogging for alcohol consumption, and execution for offenses such as spreading corruption on Earth (ifsad fi al-arz) or waging war against God (moharebeh). The National Front of Iran denounced the proposed law as “inhumane" and called upon the people of Tehran to participate in a demonstration for 15 June 1981.

The clerical establishment interpreted these criticisms as a direct assault on Islam, the Quran, and divine law. In June 1981, Khomeini issued a series of religious decrees targeting critics, declaring that “those who oppose the essential laws of Islam” were apostates (murtad). He specifically condemned members of the National Front, accusing them of aligning with “infidels,” “communists,” and “religious hypocrites.” He denounced these groups as “enemies of Allah and Islam” who had “dug their graves with their own hands.” In his view, “anyone who calls God’s decree ‘inhuman,’ and anyone who describes Islam as ‘inhuman,’” was to be regarded as a kafir (infidel).

In the meantime Hezbollah members of the Revolutionary Guard and committees, men and women from the wards of south Tehran organized by the IRP machine poured into Ferdowsi Square, the designated meeting place for the rally. The large numbers of middle-class protesters and supporters of the National Front who also showed up were cowed into virtual silence. There was no organized demonstration, no speeches, no march.

Leaders of the Liberation Movement and Banisadr had to make a public apology for supporting the Front's appeal on TV and the radio.

== Election results ==
=== Parliamentary elections ===
Election	Party leader	Seats won
1950	Mohammad Mossadegh	11 / 136 (8%)
1952	Mohammad Mossadegh	30 / 79 (38%)
Did not contest in 1954 and 1956
1960	Allahyar Saleh	0 / 200 (0%)
1961	Allahyar Saleh	1 / 200 (0.5%)
Did not contest between 1961 and 1979
1980	Karim Sanjabi	4 / 270 (1%)
Has not contested since 1981

== Party leaders ==
- Mohammad Mosaddegh (1949–1960)
- Allah-Yar Saleh (1960–1964)
- Karim Sanjabi (1967–1988)
- Adib Boroumand (1993–2017)
- Seyed Hossein Mousavian (since 2018)

== See also ==
Opposing organizations

- Confederation of Iranian Students

Affiliated organizations

- Iran Party
- Party of the Iranian People
- Toilers Party of the Iranian Nation (left in 1952; defunct)
- Society of Muslim Warriors (left in 1952; defunct)
- Nation Party of Iran (left in 1979)
- League of Iranian Socialists (left in 1979; defunct)
- Third Force (defunct)
- Movement of God-Worshipping Socialists (defunct)

Splinter organizations

- Freedom Movement of Iran (1961)
- National Democratic Front (1979; defunct)
