= Hassan Emami =

Iranian cleric (1903–1981)

Seyyed Hassan Emami
- حسن امامی
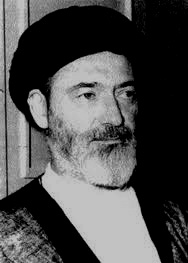

13th Speaker of the Parliament of Iran
- In office 1 July 1952 – 6 August 1952
- Preceded by: Reza Hekmat
- Succeeded by: Abolghasem Kashani

Member of the Parliament
- In office 27 April 1952 – 16 August 1953
- Constituency: Mahabad

Tehran's Friday Prayer Imam
- In office 2 February 1946 – 18 January 1979
- Appointed by: Mohammad Reza Pahlavi
- Preceded by: Mohammad Emami
- Succeeded by: Mahmoud Taleghani

Personal details
- Born: 1903 Tehran, Qajar Iran
- Died: 14 July 1979 (aged 75–76) Lausanne, Switzerland
- Education: University of Lausanne
- Occupation: Law professor

Hassan Emami (Persian: حسن امامی; 1903–14 July 1979) was an Iranian Shia cleric and politician who was the 13th Speaker of the Parliament of Iran in 1952 and also Tehran's Friday Prayer Imam from 1946 until his resignation in 1979 amid the Iranian Revolution. He worked as a judge in the Ministry of Justice and taught law at the University of Tehran.

He was regarded as a member of the Mohammad Reza Shah's inner circle, and had close ties to bazaari and traditional classes, as well as Masonic lodges. He supported Reza Shah's secular reforms, despite his family's history of religious conservatism. Emami is described an Anglophile politician and staunchly hostile to Mohammad Mossadegh and his policies. He discarded his religious attire after he returned from Switzerland, where he studied continental law, but resumed wearing it when he was appointed as Tehran's Friday prayer imam in 1947.

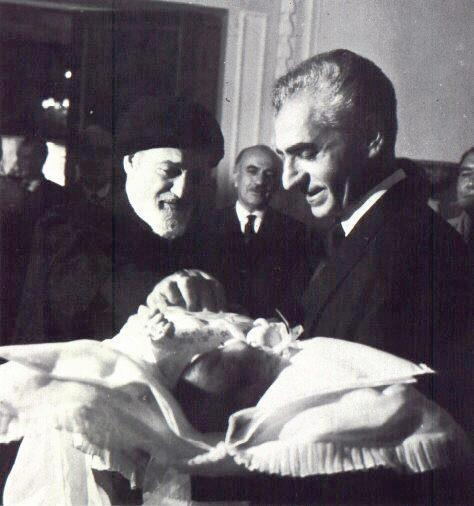
Hassan Emami (left) with the Shah (right) and his newborn son Crown Prince Reza Pahlavi (left)

In 1952 Iranian legislative election, Emami stood as a candidate from Kurdish and Sunni city of Mahabad, where he had never been. He was elected with the interference by Artesh, thus Mohammad Mossadegh asked the parliament to reject his credentials but he was affirmed. On 1 July 1952, he defeated the National Front-backed Abdullah Moazzami for the Speaker of the Parliament of Iran. Emami fled the country following the 21 July pro-Mohammad Mossadegh demonstrations and offered his resignation in a message from Geneva.

== Bibliography ==
- Ḥoqūq-e madanī (Civic Jurisprudence; 6 vols., Tehran, 1335-42 Š./1956-63)

Assembly seats
Preceded by Reza Hekmat	Speaker of the Parliament of Iran; 1952	Succeeded by Abolghasem Kashani
Religious titles
Preceded by Mohammad Emami	Tehran's Friday Prayer Imam; 1947–1979	Succeeded by Mahmoud Taleghani
