= Ahmad Jannati =

Iranian principlist politician (born February 23, 1927)

Ayatollah Ahmad Jannati
- احمد جنتی
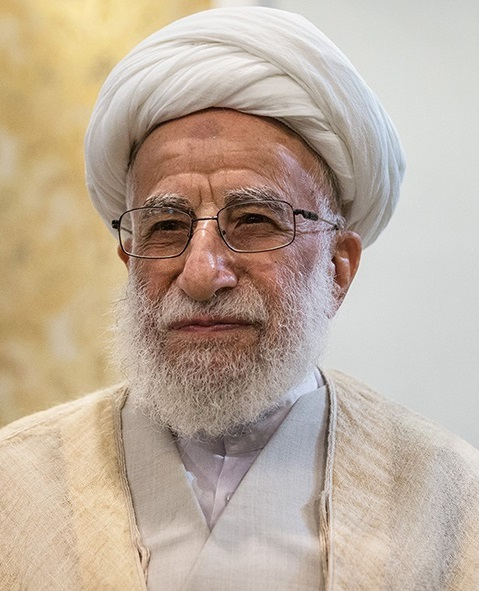
- Jannati in 2020

5th Chairman of the Assembly of Experts
- In office 24 May 2016 – 21 May 2024
- Supreme Leader: Ali Khamenei
- Preceded by: Mohammad Yazdi
- Succeeded by: Mohammad-Ali Movahedi Kermani

Secretary of the Guardian Council
- Incumbent
- Assumed office 17 July 1992
- Appointed by: Ali Khamenei
- Preceded by: Mohammad Mohammadi Gilani
- Succeeded by
Other offices held
Member of Expediency Discernment Council
In office 17 March 1997 – 20 September 2022
Appointed by	Ali Khamenei
Chairman	Akbar Hashemi Rafsanjani; Ali Movahedi-Kermani (acting); Mahmoud Hashemi Shahroudi; Sadeq Larijani
Tehran's Temporary Friday Prayer Imam
In office 3 April 1992 – 11 March 2018
Imam	Ali Khamenei
Member of the Assembly of Experts
In office 23 February 1999 – 20 May 2024
Constituency	Tehran Province
Majority	1,321,130 (29.35%)
In office 15 August 1983 – 22 February 1999
Constituency	Khuzestan Province

Member of the Guardian Council
- Incumbent
- Assumed office 20 February 1980
- Appointed by: Ruhollah Khomeini; Ali Khamenei

Personal details
- Born: 23 February 1927 (age 99) Isfahan, Imperial State of Iran
- Party: Combatant Clergy Association; Society of Seminary Teachers of Qom
- Spouses: Sediqeh Mazaheri (m. 1947; died 2015); Second spouse (m. 2017; died 2023)
- Children: 4, including Ali
- Profession: Politician; cleric

Ayatollah Ahmad Jannati (Note: Persian: احمد جنتی, romanized: Ahmad Jenti) (born 23 February 1927) is an Iranian politician and cleric who has served as the secretary of the Guardian Council since 1992. He previously served as the fifth chairman of the Assembly of Experts from 2016 to 2024. A Principlist, Jannati has strong conservative views, such as his anti-LGBTQ rhetoric and opposition to secularism.

== Career ==
Jannati has been a member of the Guardian Council since 1980 and has been its chair since 1992. In 2016, he became the chairman of the Assembly of Experts, the body in charge of appointing the Supreme Leader. He was reappointed to the earlier post in 2022 and in 2023 he was re-appointed to the post of chairman of the Guardian Council.

== Views ==
During a Friday Prayer on 4 August 2006, Jannati asserted that "support for Hezbollah" was "a duty." Regarding Iraq, around the time its draft constitution was presented to parliament in 2005, he said: "Fortunately, after years of effort and expectations in Iraq, an Islamic state has come to power and the constitution has been established on the basis of Islamic precepts".

=== On election protests ===
In a Friday prayer sermon on 29 January 2010 in Tehran, Jannati praised Iranian judicial authorities for executing two political dissidents the day before and urged officials to continue executing dissidents until opposition protests end.

Jannati sees leniency with the dissidents as un-Islamic.

"God ordered the prophet Muhammad to brutally slay hypocrites and ill-intentioned people who stuck to their convictions. Koran insistently orders such deaths. May God not forgive anyone showing leniency toward the corrupt on Earth."

Responding to clerics such as Jannati wanting to speed up executions, Iran's judiciary chief firmly stated his opposition, commenting that it was against the Sharia and Iranian law:

"Political assumptions should not influence judicial investigations because we won't have a response before God should an innocent person be punished due to hasty action."

=== On the United States ===
In a 1 June 2007 speech aired on Iranian TV Channel 1 (as translated by MEMRI), Jannati stated:

Today, we can see that even in America, people are increasingly inclined towards Islam. In other countries, the Islamic revival has begun. People are increasingly inclined towards the Koran, towards Islam, towards the Islamic Revolution and the Imam [Khomeini]. Just like this movement destroyed the monarchical regime here, it will definitely destroy the arrogant rule of the hegemony of America, Israel, and their allies. [...] At the end of the day, we are an anti-American regime. America is our enemy, and we are the enemies of America. The hostility between us is not a personal matter. It is a matter of principle. We are in disagreement over the very principles that underlie our revolution and our Islam.

In April 2008, he stated, "You cried: 'Death to the Shah' and indeed, he died. You cried: 'Death to Israel' and it is now on its deathbed. You cry: 'Death to America', and before long, Allah willing, the prayer for the dead will be recited over it." In the same speech, he stated: "The military philosophy of Islam is to create a force with in Islam that will be the most powerful force, which no one can defeat."

On 17 September 2010, Jannati "described the recent desecration of the holy Quran in the United States [as] an insane behavior," apparently referring to the 2010 Qur'an-burning controversy. In the same Friday Prayer, he reportedly claimed that "opinion polls reveal[ed] that 84 percent of the Americans consider the US administration responsible for 9/11 attacks." The Ayatollah's comments about Americans' opinions about 9/11 were cited by analysts after President Ahmadinejad made similar comments, amongst others, the next week at the United Nations. The president's speech sparked at least 33 delegations to walk out from the General Assembly, and ensuing criticism.

In a sermon in Tehran, which was broadcast on Iran's Channel 1 on 21 February 2014 (as translated by MEMRI), Jannati told a crowd that "If we, the people, are against America, you [Iranian leaders] must oppose it too" and that "Death to America" was "the first option on our table...This is the slogan of our entire people, without exception. This is our number one slogan."

=== On hijab ===
Jannati takes a strong stand in favor of compulsory hijab, or covering for women. In June 2010, he spoke out against Iranian President Ahmadinejad for his alleged laxness on compulsory hijab in Iran. After Ahmadinejad proposed a "cultural campaign" to combat loose hijab rather than a police crackdown, Jannati responded, "Drug traffickers are hanged, terrorists are executed and robbers are punished for their crimes, but when it comes to the law of God, which is above human rights," some individuals "stay put and speak about cultural programs."

== Public image ==
According to a poll conducted in March 2016 by Information and Public Opinion Solutions LLC (iPOS) among Iranian citizens, Jannati has 21% approval and 31% disapproval ratings and thus a –10% net popularity, while 36% of Iranian people don't recognize the name. Some say Jannati has become a target of ageist stereotyping in Iran, as he is 99 years old and many question whether he should have retired by now. Janati said in 2012 that "young revolutionaries" should occupy key posts in the country - a quote that brought him criticism and mockery given his own age.

== Sanctions ==
In February 2020, the U.S. Treasury Department sanctioned Jannati for "preventing free and fair elections in Iran."

== Personal life ==
Jannati's wife was Sediqeh Mazaheri, with whom he had four sons. She died in 2015, and he later remarried. His son Hossein Jannati was a member of People's Mojahedin of Iran and was killed in a street battle by the Islamic Republic security forces in 1981. His son Ali Jannati served as Minister of Culture.

== See also ==
- List of ayatollahs
- List of Iranian officials
- Khamenei
- Ahmad Khatami
- Emami-Kashani
- Aboutorabi Fard
- Movahedi-Kermani
- Haj Ali Akbari
- Friday prayer
- List of members in the First Term of the Council of Experts

== Notes ==
Political offices
Preceded by Mohammad Mohammadi Gilani	Chair of Guardian Council; 1992–present	Succeeded by Incumbent
Preceded by Mohammad Yazdi	Chairman of the Assembly of Experts; 2016–2024	Succeeded by Mohammad-Ali Movahedi Kermani
