= Muhammad Javad Haj Ali Akbari =

Iranian politician and cleric

- محمدجواد حاج‌علی‌اکبری

Tehran's Ephemeral Friday Prayer Imam
- Incumbent
- Assumed office 31 December 2018
- Appointed by: Ali Khamenei

Vice President of Iran Head of National Youth Organization
- In office 29 August 2005 – 24 July 2009
- President: Mahmoud Ahmadinejad
- Preceded by: Rahim Ebadi
- Succeeded by: Mehrdad Bazrpash

Personal details
- Born: June 1965 (age 61) Damavand, Tehran Province
- Education: Qom Seminary

Military service
- Branch/service: IRGC
- Rank: Brigadier general

Muhammad Javad Haj Ali Akbari (Persian: محمدجواد حاج‌علی‌اکبری) is an Iranian principlist politician and a Twelver cleric. He serves as temporary Imam of Friday Prayer in Tehran.

== Early life ==
Akbari obtained his bachelor's degree in the subject of fiqh and Islamic law after studying elementary (related) education. He studied in the superior levels and "Kharej-Fiqh Osul" (a kind of high-level lessons in seminary) while learning Arabic and English.

Among his known teachers are: Seyyed Ali Khamenei, Mohammad-Taqi Bahjat Foumani, Abdollah Javadi-Amoli, Mohammed Emami-Kashani and Aziz Khoshvaght.

== Career ==
Iranian Supreme leader Ali Khamenei appointed him as chief of "Imams of Friday Prayer Policy Council" in 2018.

He served as head of "Imam Sadiq Seminary", Damavant Imam-Jom'ah", the representative of the supreme leader in the "Union of students Islamic Associations".

== Mahsa Amini protests ==
In the wake of the Mahsa Amini protests, Ali-Akbari said, "Our security is our distinctive privilege. The Iranian people demand the harshest punishment for these barbaric rioters," at the Friday prayers on 30 September 2022.

== See also ==
- Seyyed Ali Khamenei
- Ahmad Khatami
- Aboutorabi Fard
- Movahedi-Kermani
- Friday prayer
