= Kazem Seddiqi =

20th and 21st-century Iranian cleric

Hojjat-ol Eslam Ayatollah Kazem Seddighi
- کاظم صدیقی
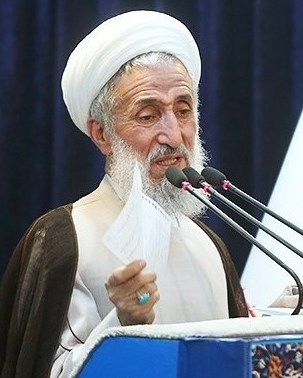

Tehran's Ephemeral Friday Prayer Imam
- In office 1 August 2009 – 3 August 2025
- Appointed by: Ali Khamenei

Personal details
- Born: March 4, 1951 (age 75) Abhar, Imperial State of Iran

Academic background
- Influences: Mohammad-Taqi Bahjat Foumani, Ruhollah Khomeini, Hussein-Ali Montazeri, Abdollah Javadi-Amoli, Muhammad Taqi Misbah Yazdi

Academic work
- Main interests: Fiqh, Kalam and philosophy
- Notable ideas: Political Spiritualism
- Influenced: Hamed Kashanian, Hamed Hosseinain

Kazem Rajabi Seddiqi (Persian: کاظم رجبی صدیقی, born 4 March 1951) is an Iranian Shia scholar and Mujtahid who previously served as one of Tehran's Friday Prayer Temporary Imam's. He also served as head of Headquarters for Enjoining the Good and Forbidding the Evil and at numerous positions in Iran's judiciary.

After the revolution, Seddighi went on to serve in Iran's judiciary at the insistence of Ali Qoddusi. In 2004 he went on to found the Imam Khomeini seminary in northern Tehran. He was appointed as one of Tehran's Friday Prayer Imam's in 2009.

Seddighi, his sons and daughter-in-law were accused of embezzling a garden in northern Tehran from the seminary under Seddighi's custodianship through a family company in February 2024. His sons and daughter-in-law were arrested by order of Iran's judiciary in May 2025, which caused Seddighi to resign from his post as Friday Prayer Imam.

== Education ==
Kazem Seddiqi went to Qom in 1963, at the same time as Seyyed Ruhollah Khomeini's movement, and began his religious education at the Haqqani Seminary. He completed his introductory courses with professors such as Khazali, Jannati, Hassanzadeh Amoli, Haeri Tehrani, Shahid Mofateh, Mohammadi Gilani, and Haram Panahi, and completed his advanced courses with Ahmadi Miyanji, Meshkini, and Mohammadi Gilani. This Shiite cleric took courses related to "outside jurisprudence" and principles from professors such as Morteza Haeri Yazdi, Shabbiri Zanjani, and Vahid Khorasani, and studied Islamic philosophy with Javadi Amoli, Misbah Yazdi, and Ansari Shirazi, and learned Western philosophy from Beheshti and Ahmadi.

== See also ==
- Seyyed Ahmad Khatami
- Seyyed Ali Akbar Aboutorabi Fard
