= Society of Muslim Warriors =

- Leader: Abol-Ghasem Kashani
- Founder: Shams Qanatabadi and Mahmoud Shervin
- Founded: December 1948; 3 February 1949 (Official)
- Dissolved: 1955
- Headquarters: Sarcheshmeh, Tehran Imperial State of Iran
- Militant wing: Fada'iyan-e Islam (1948–51)
- Membership (1948): ~2,000
- Ideology: Islamism; Pragmatism; Pan-Islamism; Islamic nationalism Social conservatism Resource nationalism
- Political position: Right-wing
- Religion: Shia Islam
- National affiliation: National Front (1949–52)
- Parliament: National Movement faction
- 17th Majlis: 2 / 79

Society of Muslim Mojaheds (Persian: مجمع مسلمانان مجاهد, romanized: Majmaʿ-e mosalmānān-e mojāhed) or Society of Mojahedin of Islam (Persian: مجمع مجاهدین اسلام, romanized: Majma'-e mojāhedin-e eslām), alternatively translated as Society of Muslim Warriors, was a Shia Islamist organization in Iran founded in late 1948. Led by Abol-Ghasem Kashani, the organization served as his multi-task religious, political, cultural, and social executive arm and mouthpiece. It was adept at mobilizing crowds for street control, gang fights, strikes and demonstrations.

The society was founded after Kashani decided that his original militant Fada'iyan-e Islam, was too single-minded and inflexible to act as a suave enforcer who could negotiate with various people. Unlike its ally Fada'iyan-e Islam, Society of Muslim Warriors was not dogmatically fundamentalist and also differed in base of support, drawing its support mainly from wealthy bazaaris, guild elders, small shopkeepers and seminary students. The two organizations revoked alliance in 1951. Society of Muslim Warriors called for the implementation of sharia, repeal of secular laws, protection of national industries and unity of Muslims against the West.

The group supported nationalization of the Iranian oil industry and was part of the National Front. It supported government of Mosaddegh from 1951 to late 1952, when it turned against the government and formed an alliance with the Toilers Party of the Iranian Nation lasting until 1953 coup d'état.

The society won two seats in the 1952 Iranian legislative election by Kashani and Qanatabadi.
