= 1952 Iranian legislative election =

1952 parliamentary elections for the Iranian legislative assembly

- 1952

79 seats to the National Consultative Assembly
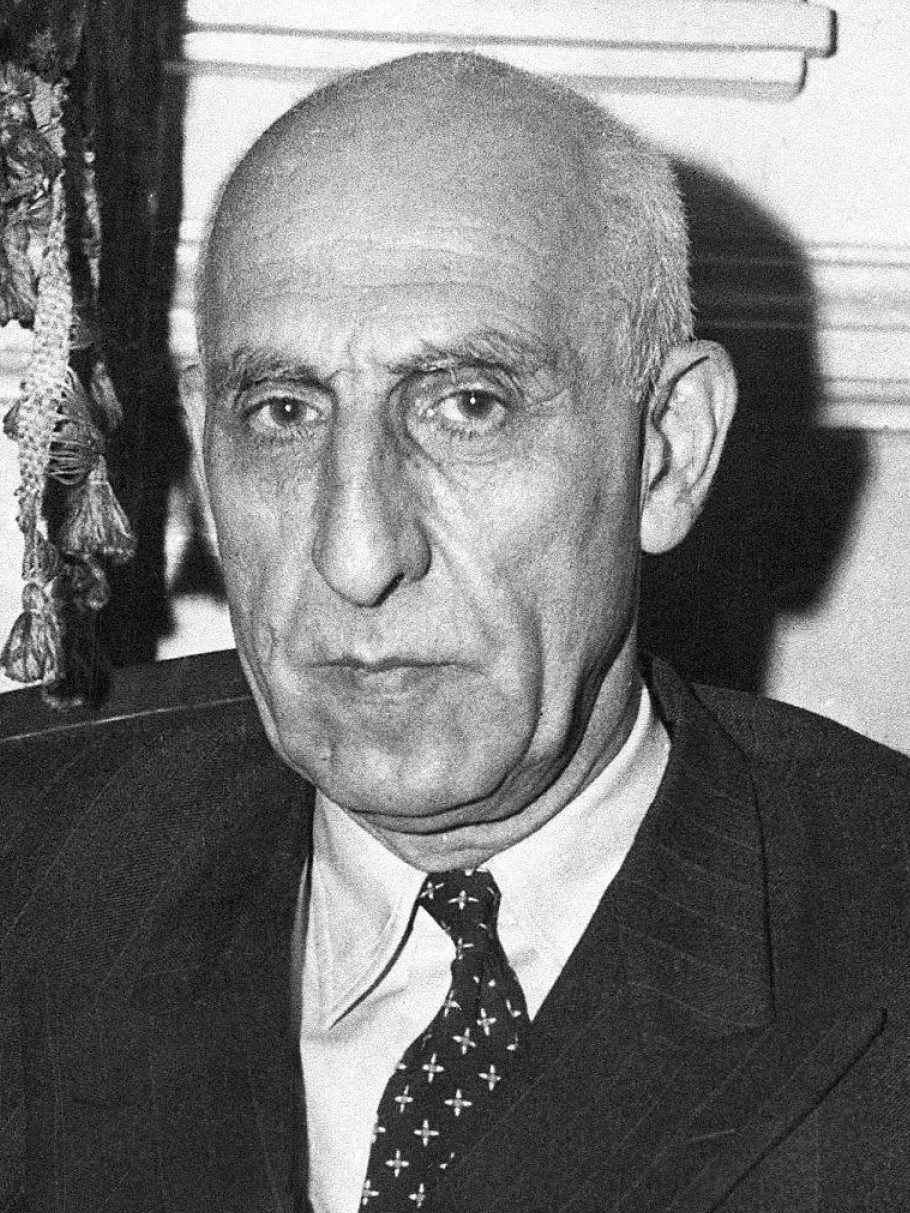

	First party	Second party
Leader	Mohammad Mosaddegh
Party	Parties: Iran Party; Toilers Party; Society of Muslim Warriors; Nation Party; Party of the Iranian People	Independent
Alliance	National Front
Leader's seat	Did not stand
Seats won	30	49
Prime Minister before election
Mohammad Mosaddegh
NF
Elected Prime Minister
Mohammad Mosaddegh
NF

Parliamentary elections were held in Iran in 1952 to elect the 17th Iranian Majlis.

== Conduct ==
The elections were held by Government of Mosaddegh, who changed several governor-generals and governors. He also ordered members of the electoral supervisory councils to be selected by lot. However, the government was unable to control the shah, Artesh, the notables, and some of its own supporters. The voting process was stopped by Prime Minister Mohammad Mosaddegh after enough MPs were elected to form a parliamentary quorum (79 out of 136). The decision is viewed as manipulation, because Mosaddegh meant to prevent opposition candidates taking seats from rural areas.

== Results ==
The highly organized Tudeh Party failed to win a single seat, despite receiving the second-highest number of votes.

In Tehran, the turnout was double that of previous election and the National Front candidates, including members of Iran Party, Toilers Party, Muslim Mojahedin and non-partisan nationalists won all twelve seats. In Tabriz, the nine deputies elected were supporters of Mossadegh.

According to David McDowall, in Mahabad the candidate known to be a Democratic Party of Iranian Kurdistan member was overwhelmingly elected but the results were annulled. However, Denise Natali states that the candidate was named Vaziri, who belonged to Tudeh Party. Royalist cleric Hassan Emami eventually took office representing the constituency and was elected as Speaker of the parliament. A CIA document states that the Shah was behind his election.

Party/alliance		Seats
Royalists		49
Pro-British		49
National Front	Iran Party	30
National Front	Toilers Party	30
National Front	Muslim Warriors	30
Vacant		57
Total		136
Source: Abrahamian

== U.S. interference ==
Historian Ervand Abrahamian, in an interview with Democracy Now!, said U.S. State Department documents declassified in 2017 reveal that their strategy was to undermine Mohammad Mosaddegh through parliament and that the Central Intelligence Agency (CIA) spent a lot of money promoting 18 of the candidates.
