= Abdul Hamid Zangeneh =

Iranian politician and academic (1899–1951)

- عبدالحمید زنگنه

Minister of Education
- In office December 1948 – March 1950

Personal details
- Born: 1899 Kermanshah, Qajar Iran
- Died: 25 March 1951 (aged 51–52) Tehran, Pahlavi Iran
- Party: Socialist Party
- Occupation: Academic

Abdul Hamid Zangeneh (1899 – 25 March 1951; Persian: عبدالحمید زنگنه) was an Iranian scholar. He served as the minister of education from December 1948 to March 1950. He was assassinated by a member of the Fada'iyan-e Islam in March 1951.

== Early life and education ==
Zangeneh was born in Kermanshah in 1899. He obtained a degree in law and political science in Tehran. He received a PhD in law and economics in Paris in 1929, and his thesis was about the oil economy.

== Career ==
Following his return to Iran in 1935 Zangeneh was employed in the Ministry of Education. He became a professor at the law school of the University of Tehran of which he served as the dean. He was co-editor of the newspaper Iran Javan. Zangeneh represented Kermanshah in the 14th term of the Majlis. In the period between December 1948 and March 1950 he served as the minister of education. He became a member of the central committee of the Socialist Party which was established by Sardar Fakhir Hikmat in July 1949.

== Assassination ==
Zanganeh was assassinated by a student in front of Tehran University on 19 March 1951 and was badly wounded in the back. He died on 25 March. The murderer was Nosratollah Ghumi, a member of the radical group Fada'iyan-e Islam.
