= Mohammad-Sadegh Tabatabaei =

Iranian politician

Seyyed Mohammad-Sadegh Tabatabaei
- محمدصادق طباطبایی
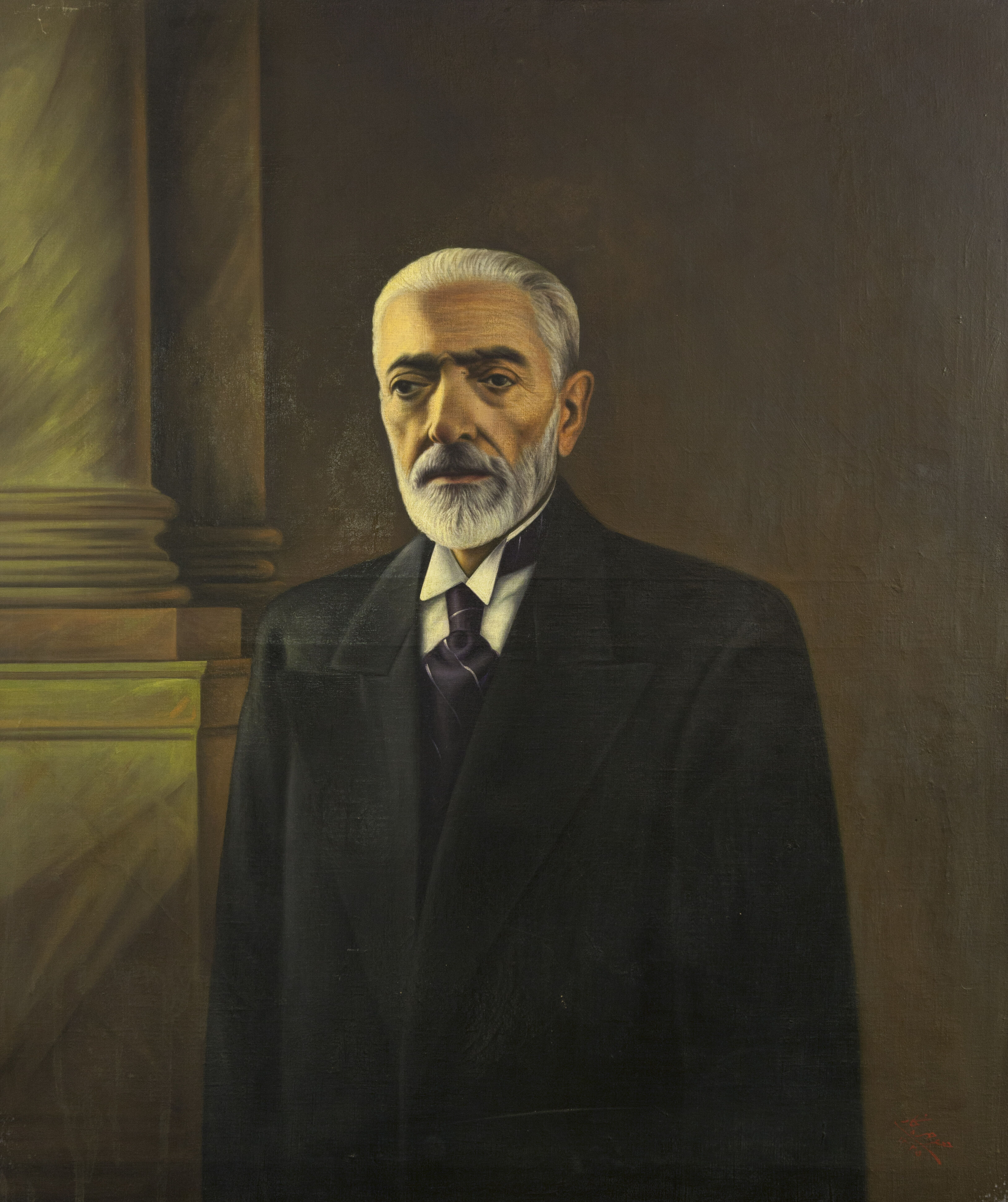
- Official portrait of Tabatabaei

11th Speaker of the Parliament of Iran
- In office 6 March 1944 – 12 March 1946
- Preceded by: Hassan Esfandiary
- Succeeded by: Reza Hekmat

Speaker of the 2nd Constituent Assembly
- In office 21 April 1949 – 10 May 1949

Member of Senate
- In office 18 March 1954 – 16 March 1960
- Constituency: Tehran

Member of Parliament
- In office 6 March 1944 – 12 March 1946
- Constituency: Tehran
- In office 11 February 1924 – 11 February 1926
- Constituency: Tehran
- In office 6 December 1914 – 13 November 1915
- Constituency: Tehran
- In office 15 November 1909 – 25 December 1911
- Constituency: Mashhad

Ambassador of Iran to the Republic of Turkey
- In office 1926–1928
- Monarch: Reza Shah Pahlavi

Ambassador of Iran to the Ottoman Empire
- In office 1923–1926
- Monarch: Ahmad Shah Qajar

Personal details
- Party: National Union (1944–1946); Socialist Party (1924–1926); Moderates (1909–1918)
- Parent: Mirza Sayyed Mohammad Tabatabai (father)

Mohammad-Sadegh Tabatabaei (Persian: محمدصادق طباطبایی) was an Iranian politician, constitutionalist activist affiliated with the Secret Society and journalist.

Assembly seats
Preceded by Hassan Esfandiary	11th Speaker of the Parliament of Iran; 1944–1946	Succeeded by Reza Hekmat
Preceded by Sadegh Mostashar as Speaker of the 1st Assembly	Speaker of the 2nd Constituent Assembly; 1949	Succeeded by Jafar Sharif-Emami as Speaker of the 3rd Assembly
Diplomatic posts
Preceded by Himself as Ambassador to Ottoman Empire	1st Iranian ambassador to Republic of Turkey; 1926–1928	Succeeded by Mohammad Ali Foroughi
Preceded by Eshagh Khan Mofakham-al-Dowleh	17th Iranian ambassador to Ottoman Empire; 1923–1926	Succeeded by Himself as Ambassador to Republic of Turkey
Party political offices
New title Party founded	Parliamentary leader of the National Unionists; 1944–1946	Vacant Party dissolved
New title Party founded	Parliamentary leader of the Moderates; 1914–1915; 1909–1911	Vacant Party dissolved
