= List of Tehran's Friday Prayer Imams =

Friday Prayer Imam of Tehran
- امام جمعه تهران
- Seal of Tehran

- Flag of Tehran
- Incumbent; Vacant since 28 February 2026
- Type: Imam of Friday Prayer
- Seat: Grand Mosalla, Tehran
- Appointer: The Supreme Leader of Iran
- Term length: Life (Appointer can appoint and remove from office)
- First holder: Sayyid Abolqasem (first known)
- Deputy: Ephemeral Imams

This article lists Tehran's Friday Prayer Imams that were appointed before and after the Iranian Revolution of 1979. It contains both the official and ephemeral Tehran's Friday prayer Imams. The most recent Imam was the Supreme Leader of Iran, Ali Khamenei, whose term lasted from his appointment by Ruhollah Khomeini in 1980 until his assassination in the 2026 Iran war.

The appointer of both the official and ephemeral Friday Prayer Imams is the Supreme Leader of Iran, who is currently Mojtaba Khamenei, a son of Ali Khamenei. Before the revolution, it was the Shah of Iran who appointed the Friday Prayer Imams. The current Ephemeral Friday Prayer Imams are Ahmad Khatami, Ali Movahedi-Kermani, Mohammad-Hassan Aboutorabi Fard and Mohammad Javad Haj Ali Akbari.

== Imams ==
=== Before the Iranian Revolution (before 1979) ===
No.	Portrait	Imam	Date	Appointed by	Notes
1		Sayyid Abolqasem	Unknown – 1908	Unknown	Dismissed from the position by the Constitutionalists
2		Mohammad Emami	1908–1947	Unknown	Died in office
3		Hassan Emami	2 February 1946 – 16 January 1979	Mohammad Reza Shah	Left office due to Iranian Revolution
Vacant (16 January 1979 – 11 February 1979)

=== Islamic Republic of Iran (from 1979) ===
No.	Portrait	Imam	Date	Appointed by	Notes
Vacant (11 February 1979 – 27 July 1979)
1		Mahmoud Taleghani	27 July 1979 – 9 September 1979	Ruhollah Khomeini	Died in office
2		Hussein-Ali Montazeri	12 September 1979 – 14 January 1980	Ruhollah Khomeini	Resigned
3		Ali Khamenei	14 January 1980 – 28 February 2026	Ruhollah Khomeini	Assassinated during office
Vacant (28 February 2026 – present)

==== Ephemeral Imams ====
No.	Portrait	Imam	Date	Appointed by	Notes
1		Abdolkarim Mousavi Ardebili	13 February 1981 – 24 December 1993	Ruhollah Khomeini	Imamate unofficially ended
2		Akbar Hashemi Rafsanjani	3 July 1981 – 17 July 2009	Ruhollah Khomeini	Imamate unofficially ended
3		Mohammed Emami-Kashani	30 October 1981 – 2 March 2024	Ruhollah Khomeini	Died in office
4		Mohammad Mahdi Rabbani Amlashi	11 December 1981 – ?	Ruhollah Khomeini	He was Imam for 3 times
5		Mohammad Yazdi	1982 – late 1990s	Ruhollah Khomeini	Resigned
6		Mohammad-Reza Mahdavi Kani	11 March 1983 – 19 June 2009	Ruhollah Khomeini	He was Imam for 100 times
7		Ahmad Jannati	3 April 1992 – 11 March 2018	Ali Khamenei	Resigned
8		Hassan Taheri Khorramabadi	?	Ali Khamenei	He was Imam for 8 times
9		Ahmad Khatami	18 December 2005 – present	Ali Khamenei	
10		Kazem Seddiqi	1 August 2009 – 3 August 2025	Ali Khamenei	Resigned
11		Ali Movahedi-Kermani	2 December 2012 – present	Ali Khamenei	
12		Mohammad-Hassan Aboutorabi Fard	14 February 2018 – present	Ali Khamenei	
13		Mohammad-Javad Haj Ali Akbari	31 December 2018 – present	Ali Khamenei	

== See also ==
- Friday prayer in Shia Islam
- List of provincial representatives appointed by Supreme Leader of Iran
