= Electoral history of Ali Larijani =

List of elections featuring Ali Larijani as a candidate

This is a summary of the electoral history of Ali Larijani, an Iranian Principlist politician who is a member and Speaker of Islamic Consultative Assembly since 2008.

== Ministry approval ==
Khatami was nominated and approved for Ministry of Culture and Islamic Guidance by Iranian Parliament.

Majlis Term	Year	Votes	%	Nominated by
4th	1992	207 / 224 8 against, 9 abstained	92.41	Akbar Hashemi Rafsanjani

== Parliament elections ==
=== 2008 ===
He was elected to the Parliament representing Qom with 239,436 (73.01%) votes. He was ranked 1st in the constituency.

=== 2012 ===
He was elected to the Parliament representing Qom with 270,382 (65.17%) votes. He was ranked 1st in the constituency.

== Speaker of the Parliament elections ==
He was elected as Speaker of the Parliament of Iran in 2 consecutive terms.

Term	Years	Session	Votes	%	Deputy
8th	2008–2012	1st	237 / 266	89.09	Mohammad-Hassan Aboutorabi Fard
8th	2008–2012	2nd	216 / 241	89.62	Mohammad-Hassan Aboutorabi Fard
8th	2008–2012	3rd	214 / 258	82.94	Mohammad-Hassan Aboutorabi Fard
8th	2008–2012	4th	212 / 244	86.88	Mohammad-Reza Bahonar
9th	2012–present	1st	177 / 270	65.55	Mohammad-Hassan Aboutorabi Fard
9th	2012–present	2nd	213 / 252	84.52	Mohammad-Hassan Aboutorabi Fard

== Presidential election ==
=== 2005 ===
In the first round, Ali Larijani finished sixth with 1,713,810 votes (5.83%) and did not advance to the second round.
