= Shahid Motahari University =

University in Tehran, Iran

- مدرسه عالی و دانشگاه شهید مطهری
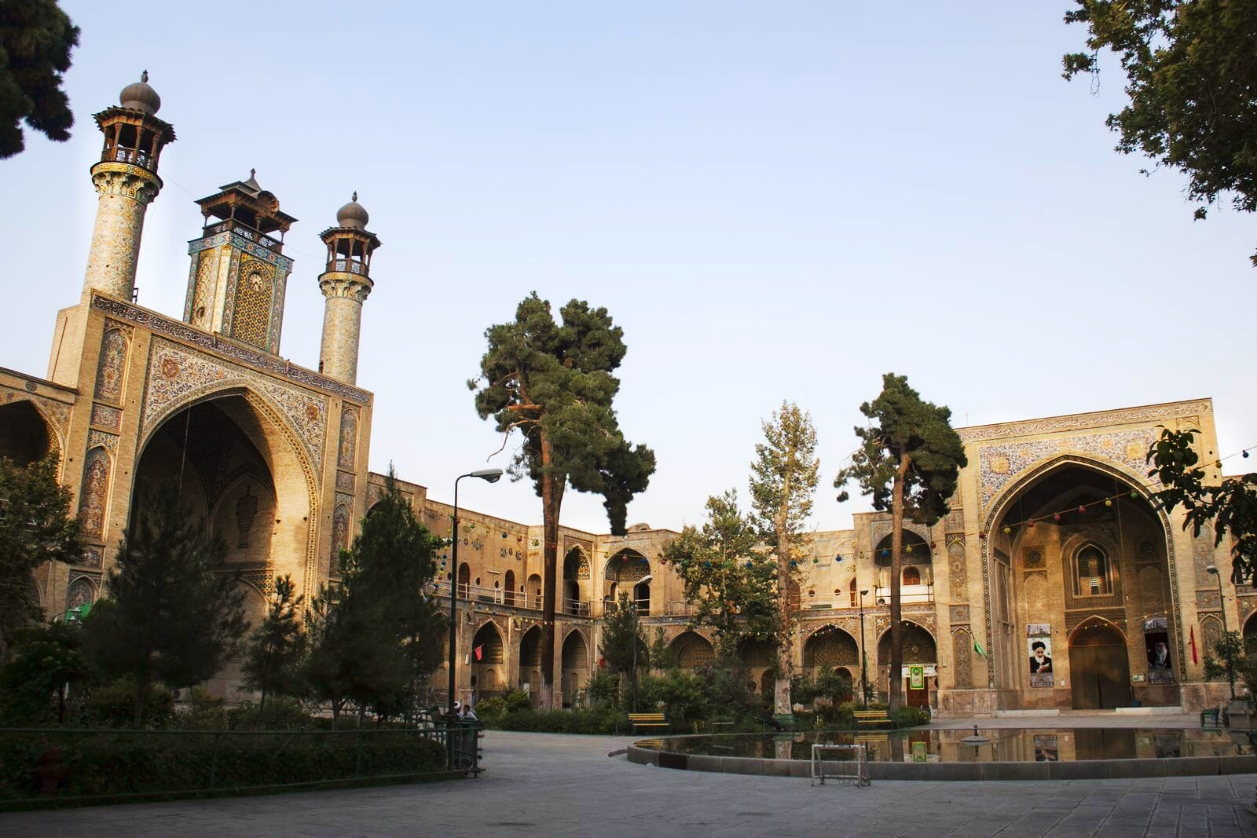
- Type: Public research university
- Established: 1879; 147 years ago
- Affiliations: FUIW
- President: Abdolali tavajjohi
- Location: Tehran, Iran
- Campus: Urban (Main Campus)
- Language: Persian
- Website: motahari.ac.ir (persian)

Shahid Motahari University (Persian: مدرسه عالی و دانشگاه شهید مطهری) was built in 1879 by Mirza Hosein Khan Sepahsalar. The university is located at Baharestan square in Tehran, Iran.

After the 1979 Iranian Revolution, Ayatollah Emami-Kashani was the president of the university until his death. Since then, the university has mostly focused on religious studies and social sciences. It is known for its graduate programs in Philosophy, Law, and Islamic Jurisprudence. Admission to the university is only possible through the annual Konkoor.

Some its notable alumni include Ebrahim Raisi (a former President of Iran), Ali Khamenei (the second Supreme Leader of Iran), Massoud Khamenei (Ali Khamenei's third son and a major Shia cleric in his own right), Mohammad Javad Hajaliakbari, (cleric and conservative politician), and Mahdi Khamooshi (president of the Endowment and Charity Affair Organization), as well as other members of the Iranian theocatic intelligentsia and assorted governmental echelons.

The president of the university is Abdolali Tavajjohi.
