= Ahmad Khatami =

Iranian cleric and politician

Ayatollah Seyyed Ahmad Khatami
- احمد خاتمی
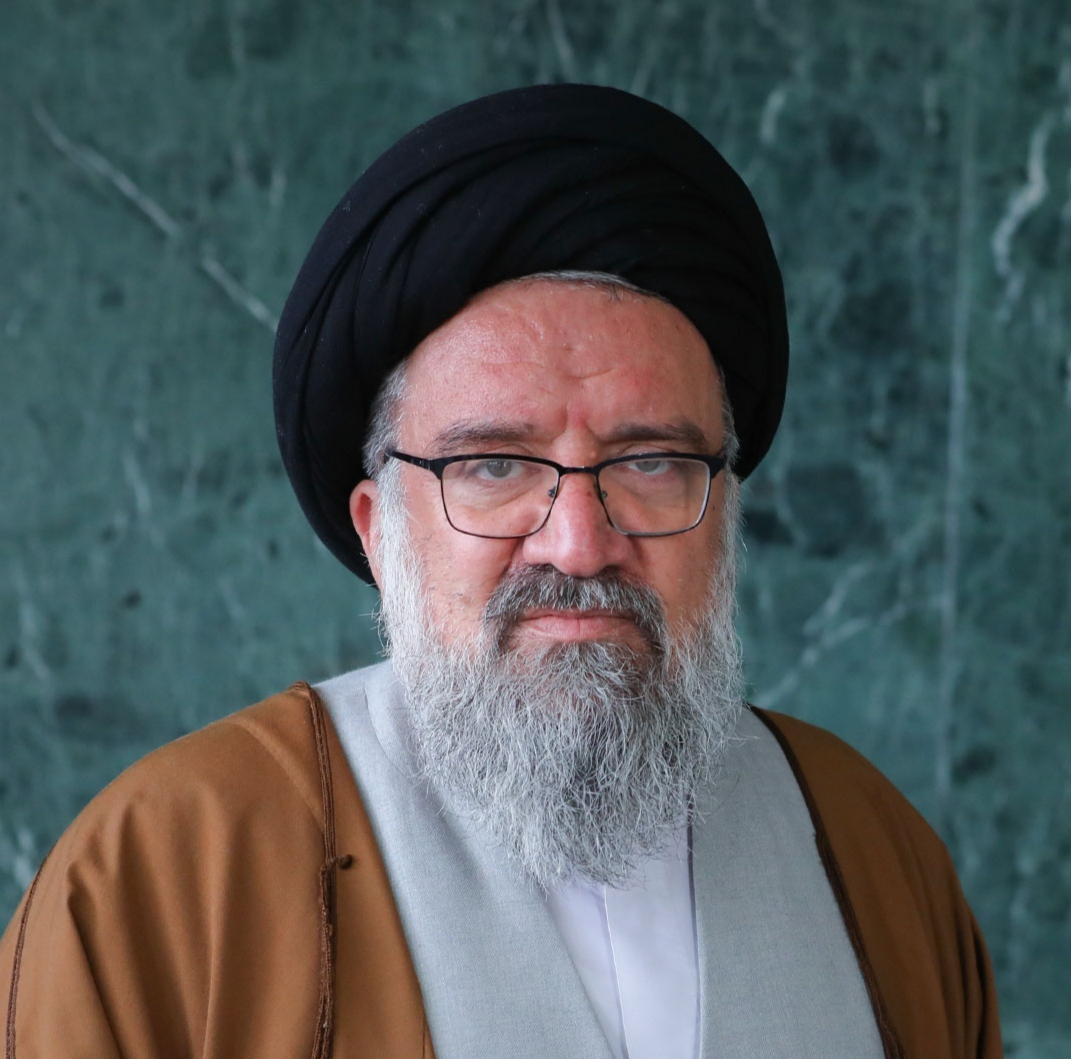
- Khatami in 2019

Tehran's Temporary Friday Prayer Imam
- Incumbent
- Assumed office 18 December 2005
- Appointed by: Ali Khamenei

Member of the Assembly of Experts
- Incumbent
- Assumed office 24 February 1999
- Constituency: Kerman Province
- Majority: 873,584 (55.96%; 3rd term)

Personal details
- Born: 8 May 1960 (age 66) Semnan, Imperial State of Iran
- Party: Society of Seminary Teachers of Qom

Ahmad Khatami (Persian: احمد خاتمی; born 8 May 1960) is a senior and prominent Iranian Muslim cleric, member of Guardian Council and a senior member of the Assembly of Experts. In December 2005, Ali Khamenei appointed him as Tehran’s substitute Friday prayer leader. He is also a conservative and principlist politician.

== Biography ==
Khatami was born in Semnan, Imperial State of Iran on 8 May 1960. He studied at Sadeghieh Seminary of Semnan for two years before switching to Qom Seminary in 1975. He works as a public speaker, delivering speeches every Friday in Qom. Khatami is respected by leaders of IRGC and conservative circles, he has very strict stances on social issues, like compulsory hijab for women in the country. Khatami is a hardliner cleric and was reportedly a loyalist of the former Supreme Leader of Iran, Ali Khamenei.

Khatami became prominent in 1997 by sharing the same surname as Mohammad Khatami, unrelated politician who won the presidential election and became president of Iran. In 1999, Khatami won an election and became a member of Assembly of Experts in Kerman province. In 1990s, Khatami claimed that Qasem Soleimani invited him to participate in multiple promotional events, which further increased his prominence. In 2005, at the age of 45, he was appointed as interim Friday prayer leader in Tehran, becoming the youngest individual to hold this position. The decision to appoint him was personally made by Ali Khamenei.

Khatami has six daughters, he said they are all married to clerics. He has no sons, Khatami is considered to be brother in law of a man named Mohammadreza Saeedi, who was imprisoned and killed prior to the Islamic revolution.

== Political views ==
Khatami has ultraconservative political stance. In 2006, during the Pope Benedict XVI Islam controversy, he asked the Pope to "fall on his knees in front of a senior Muslim cleric and try to understand Islam". In 2007, he addressed the death sentence issued by Ruhollah Khomeini against Salman Rushdie, saying "In the Islamic Iran that revolutionary fatwa of Imam [Khomeini] is still alive and cannot be changed."

In regard to the 2009 Iranian election protests, Khatami denounced demonstrators as rioters who wage war against God ("mohareb"), (a capital crime in Islamic law). He also threatened Iranian President Mahmoud Ahmadinejad, saying he would lose legitimacy if he continued to ignore the Supreme Leader's orders. During a Friday prayer, he said that the one of the core foundations of the Iranian government is following the instructions of Ali Khamenei. Khatami accused reformist presidential candidates Mir-Hossein Mousavi and Mehdi Karroubi of Mohareb as "leaders of sedition" in 2011.

Khatami has conflated Jews with Zionists and once accused "Zionists" of committing crimes against Muslims since the early days of Islam. During a sermon aired by Iranian-state radio in January 2026, Khatami called for the death penalty for those involved in the 2025–2026 Iranian protests and threatened U.S president Donald Trump.

== See also ==
- Ali Khamenei
- Emami-Kashani
- Aboutorabi Fard
- Mohammad-Ali Movahedi Kermani
- Haj Ali Akbari
- Friday prayer
