= Abdollah Moazzami =

Iranian politician (died 1971)

- عبدالله معظمی
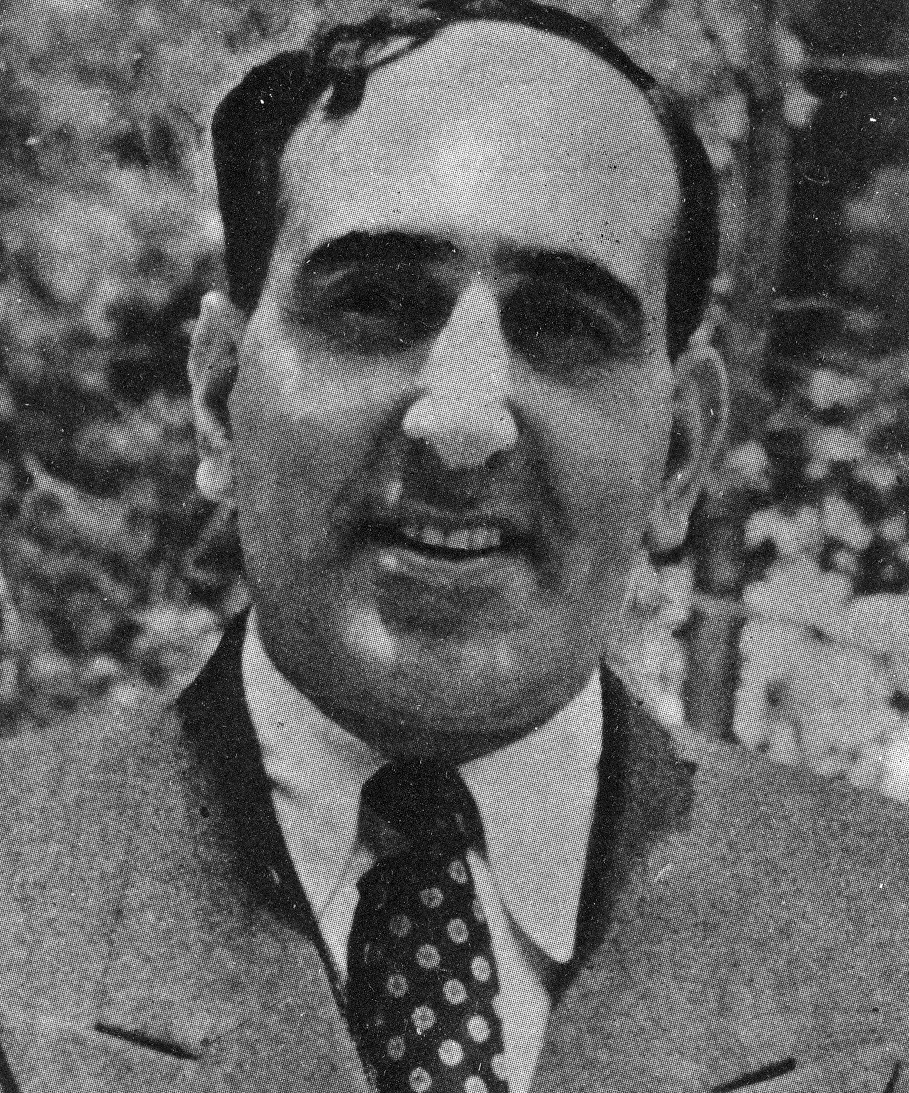

15th Speaker of the Parliament of Iran
- In office 1 July 1953 – 16 August 1953
- Preceded by: Abolghasem Kashani
- Succeeded by: Reza Hekmat

Member of the Parliament
- In office 27 April 1952 – 16 August 1953
- Constituency: Khvansar and Golpayegan
- In office 9 February 1950 – 19 February 1952
- Constituency: Khvansar and Golpayegan
- In office 12 June 1947 – 28 July 1949
- Constituency: Khvansar and Golpayegan
- In office 7 March 1944 – 12 March 1946
- Constituency: Khvansar and Golpayegan

Personal details
- Born: 1907 or 1909 Golpayegan, Sublime State of Iran
- Died: 1971 Tehran, Imperial State of Iran
- Resting place: Ibn Babawayh Cemetery
- Party: Iran Party; National Front
- Education: University of Paris
- Occupation: Law professor

Abdollah Moazzami (Persian: عبدالله معظمی) was an Iranian lawyer and politician. He taught at University of Tehran and was a member of Parliament of Iran for four consecutive terms from 1944 to 1953. Moazami came from an upper-class and titled landlord family and has been described as a "man of moderate demeanor and connected with several factions by both family and politics".

In 1952, he lost to the royalist cleric Hassan Emami for the Speaker of the Parliament of Iran. On 1 July 1953, he was elected as the speaker by a vote of 41 to 31, with one abstention.

After the 1953 Iranian coup d'état, he was briefly imprisoned.

His brother, Seyfollah Moazami, served as minister of post & telegraph under Government of Mohammad Mosaddegh.
