= Ahmad Kashani =

Iranian politician (born 1947)

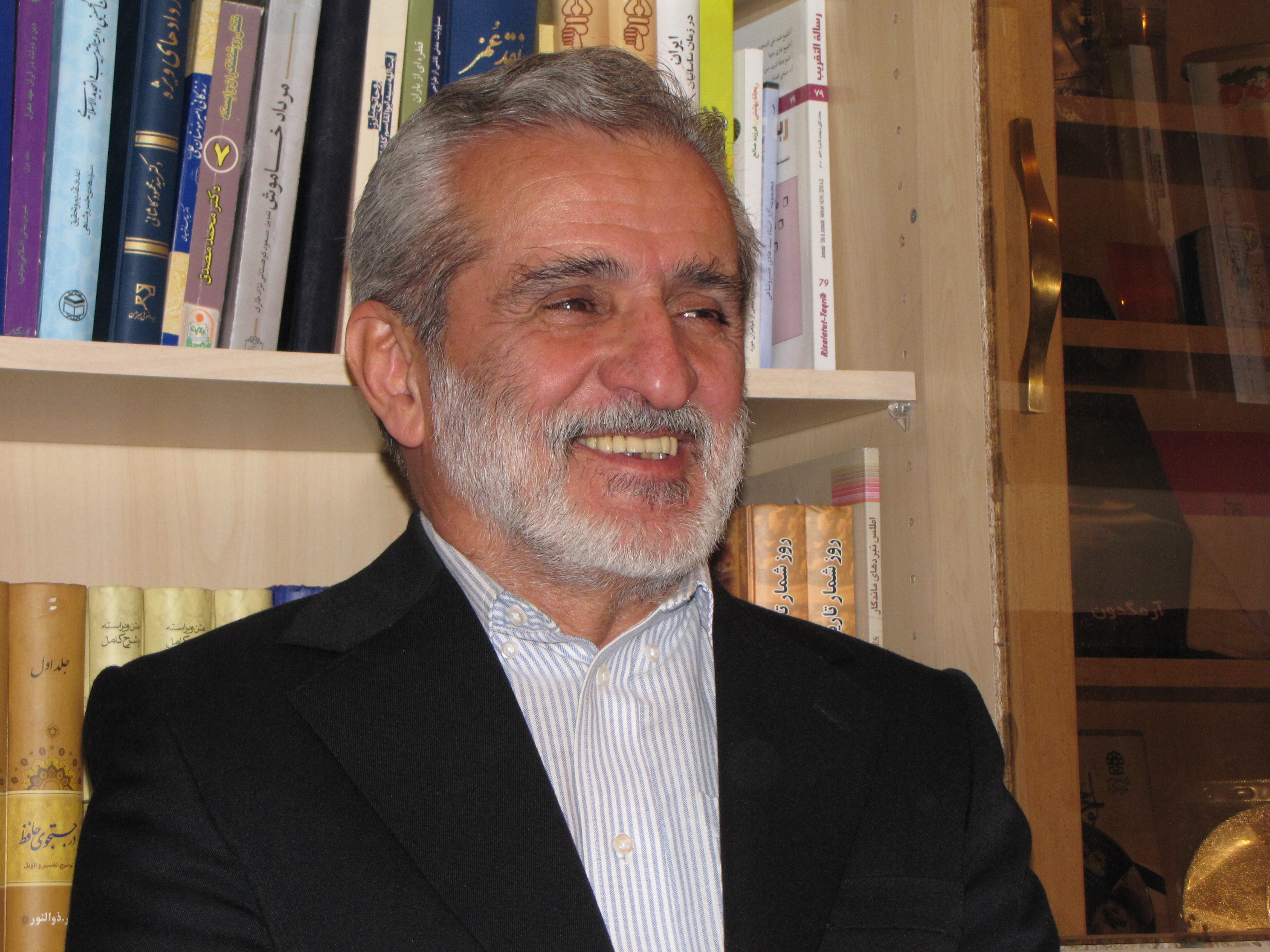
- Relatives: Abol-Ghasem Kashani (Father); Mahmoud Kashani (Brother)

Ahmad Kashani (Persian: احمد کاشانی) is an Iranian politician. He was a member of the Iranian parliament from 1980 to 1986. On 5 November 1986, although still a member of the parliament, he was arrested by the Ministry of Intelligence and National Security and passed 2 years of his life in the jail. He registered as a presidential candidate in the 2013 Iranian presidential election. His nomination was rejected by Guardian Council.

== Early life and family ==
He was born on 23 December 1947 in Tehran, Imperial State of Iran. His father, Abol-Ghasem Kashani was a prominent Twelver Shia Muslim cleric and former chairman of the parliament. He is also a younger brother of Mahmoud Kashani.

== Career ==
According to Trita Parsi's Treacherous Alliance, in early 1980 Kashani visited Israel to discuss arms sales and military cooperation regarding Iraq's Osirak nuclear reactor. This resulted in an arms deal (a shipment of F4 Phantom tyres and other weapons, the beginning of Operation Seashell) and the Ayatollah Khomeini's permission for large numbers of Iranian Jews to leave Iran, including thousands who left via bus to Pakistan and then via air to Austria, before heading to the US or Israel.

Kashani was a deputy for Natanz when he was one of several arrested in 1986 on charges of conspiring with Mehdi Hashemi. Details of the alleged links with Hashemi were not provided. Hashemi and one other were executed, while the rest, including Kashani, were pardoned or received sentences. Kashani was released after 28 months.
