= List of ambassadors of Iran to Turkey =

Coordinates: 39.901167°N 32.863237°E

Ambassador of Iran to Turkey
- İran İslam Cumhuriyeti Ankara Büyükelçiliği; Persian: سفیر جمهوری اسلامی ایران در ترکیه
- Coat of Arms of Iran
- Incumbent; Mohammad Hassan Habibollahzadeh since July 27, 2023
- Inaugural holder: Sarokhan Talesh Sarou Khan
- Formation: 1636

The Iranian ambassador in Ankara is the official representative of the Government in Tehran to the Government of Turkey.

The Persian embassy was established next to the Sublime Porte in 1852 (1230 years After the Hijrah AH) and Hajji Mirza Ahmad Khan Khoi was appointed to the expedition and the resident minister. The mission continued until 1854 (1232). 2 Mirza Abdul Rahim Khan Sa'id al-Mulk from 1854 (1232 AH) to 1857 (1235 AH) Shi'a 3. Farrokh Khan Aminolmolk Ghaffari

== List of representatives ==
Diplomatic accreditation	Diplomatic accreditation Solar Hijri calendar	Ambassador	Persian language	Observations	List of presidents of Iran	List of prime ministers of Turkey	Term end	Term end Solar Hijri calendar
1636	1014	Sarokhan Talesh Sarou Khan	Persian: ساروخان تالش		Safi of Persia	Murad IV	1636	1014
1811	1189	Mirza Abolhassan Khan Ilchi	Persian: ابوالحسن شیرازی		Fath-Ali Shah Qajar	Mahmud II	1811	1189
1837	1215	Mirza Hosein Khan Moshir od-Dowleh	Persian: جعفر مشیرالدوله	Mirza Ja'far Khan Moshir al-Dowleh (1790 1862) 1858-1862 he was Head of State Council of Persia .	Mohammad Shah Qajar	Mahmud II	1844	1222
1852	1230	Ahmad Khan Khoi	Persian: میرزا احمد خان خویی		Naser al-Din Shah Qajar	Abdülmecid I	1854	1232
1854	1232	Abdul Rahim Khan Sa'id al-Mulk	Persian: عبدالرحیم ساعدالملک	resident minister Mirza Abdulrahim Khan	Naser al-Din Shah Qajar	Abdülmecid I	1857	1235
1857	1235	Farrokh Khan	Persian: فرخ خان غفاری		Naser al-Din Shah Qajar	Abdülmecid I	1859	1237
1859	1237	Husayn Khan	Persian: حسین مشیرالدوله		Naser al-Din Shah Qajar	Abdülmecid I	1872	1250
1872	1250	Hasan 'Ali Khan Garusi	Persian: امیرنظام گروسی		Naser al-Din Shah Qajar	Abdülaziz	1874	1252
1874	1252	Muhsin Khan	Persian: محسن مظاهر		Naser al-Din Shah Qajar	Abdülaziz	1891	1269
1874	1269	Asadullah Nazimdullah	Persian: اسدالله ناظم‌الدوله	Asadullah Nazimdullah was one of the Qajar rulers. He graduated in Russia and then recruited the Foreign Ministry. There were positions at the Iranian embassy in St. Petersburg, Tbilisi, and Istanbul. Then he became the justice minister and at the end of his life was the head of Darlāshuri Kobra. He died in 1319 AH	Naser al-Din Shah Qajar	Abdülaziz	1895	1273
1891	1273	Mahmoud Alaalmolk	Persian: محمود علاءالملک		Naser al-Din Shah Qajar	Murad V	1902	1280
1895	1280	Mirza Riza Khan	Persian: رضا ارفع‌الدوله		Naser al-Din Shah Qajar	Murad V	1908	1286
1902	1289	Mahmood Alamir	Persian: محمود علامیر		Mozaffar ad-Din Shah Qajar	Murad V	1918	1296
1911	1299	Mirza Ali Quli Khan Ansari (Mushaver-el-Mamalek (1875-1938)	Persian: علیقلی مسعود انصاری		Ahmad Shah Qajar	Mehmed V	1923	1301
1921	1299	Aliqoli Nabil-al-Dawlah	Persian: علیقلی نبیل‌الدوله		Ahmad Shah Qajar	Fevzi Çakmak	1923	1301
1921	1301	Eshagh Khan Mofakhamed-Dovleh	Persian: اسحاق مفخم‌الدوله		Ahmad Shah Qajar	Fevzi Çakmak	1925	1303
1923	1303	Mohammad Sadegh Tabataba'i	Persian: سید محمدصادق طباطبایی		Ahmad Shah Qajar	Fethi Okyar	1926	1304
1926	1304	Seyed Mohammad Sadegh Tabatabaei	Persian: سید محمدصادق طباطبایی		Reza Shah	Fethi Okyar	1928	1306
1929	1307	Mohammad Ali Foroughi	Persian: محمدعلی فروغی		Reza Shah	Fethi Okyar	1931	1309
1931	1309	Sadeq Sadiq	Persian: صادق صادق		Reza Shah	Fethi Okyar	1936	1314
1936	1314	Khalil Fahimi (Fahim ol-Mulk)	Persian: خلیل فهیمی		Reza Shah	Fethi Okyar	1940	1318
1940	1318	Bagher Kazemi	Persian: باقر کاظمی		Reza Shah	Refik Saydam	1941	1319
1941	1319	Anoushirvan Sepahbodi	Persian: انوشیروان سپهبدی		Mohammad Reza Pahlavi	Refik Saydam	1945	1323
1945	1323	Ali Gholi Ardalan	Persian: علیقلی اردلان		Mohammad Reza Pahlavi	Ahmet Fikri Tüzer	1946	1324
1946	1324	Musa Nuri Esfandiari	Persian: موسی نوری اسفندیاری		Mohammad Reza Pahlavi	Mehmet Recep Peker	1948	1326
1948	1326	Mohammad Ali Homayoun Jah	Persian: محمدعلی همایونجاه		Mohammad Reza Pahlavi	Hasan Saka	1949	1327
1949	1327	Ghasim Ghani	Persian: قاسم غنی		Mohammad Reza Pahlavi	Şemsettin Günaltay	1950	1328
1950	1328	Jamshid Gharib	Persian: جمشید قریب		Mohammad Reza Pahlavi	Adnan Menderes	1951	1329
1951	1329	Mohammad Sa'ed Moraghi	Persian: محمد ساعد مراغه‌ای		Mohammad Reza Pahlavi	Adnan Menderes	1952	1330
1952	1330	Abraham Zand	Persian: ابراهیم زند		Mohammad Reza Pahlavi	Adnan Menderes	1954	1332
1954	1332	Ali Mansur	Persian: علی منصور		Mohammad Reza Pahlavi	Adnan Menderes	1958	1336
1958	1336	Amir Abbas Hoveyda	Persian: امیرعباس هویدا		Mohammad Reza Pahlavi	Adnan Menderes	1958	1336
1958	1336	Hasan Arfa	Persian: حسن ارفع		Mohammad Reza Pahlavi	Adnan Menderes	1962	1340
1962	1340	Musa Nuri Esfandiari	Persian: موسی نوری اسفندیاری		Mohammad Reza Pahlavi	İsmet İnönü	1963	1341
1964	1342	Khosrow Khosravani	Persian: خسرو خسروانی		Mohammad Reza Pahlavi	İsmet İnönü	1966	1344
1966	1344	Jafar Aftabi	Persian: جعفر کفایی		Mohammad Reza Pahlavi	Suad Hayri Ürgüplü	1967	1345
1967	1345	Homayoun Ardalan	Persian: همایون اردلان		Mohammad Reza Pahlavi	Suad Hayri Ürgüplü	2588	1966
1968	1346	Fereydoun Moustaghi	Persian: فریدون موثقی		Mohammad Reza Pahlavi	Suad Hayri Ürgüplü	1970	1348
July 23, 1970	1348	Amir Shilati	Persian: امیر شیلانی‌فرد	has served as Counsellor at the Iranian embassy in Ankara for five years and as Cónsul-General in Istanbul.	Mohammad Reza Pahlavi	Suad Hayri Ürgüplü	1974	1352
1974	1352	Jamshid Gharib	Persian: جمشید قریب		Mohammad Reza Pahlavi	Mustafa Bülent Ecevit	1976	1354
1976	1354	Darius Kupal	Persian: داریوش کوپال		Mohammad Reza Pahlavi	Süleyman Demirel	1978	1356
1978	1356	Hooshang Batmanaghlych	Persian: هوشنگ باتمانقلیچ		Mohammad Reza Pahlavi	Mustafa Bülent Ecevit	1978	1356
1978	1356	Hooshang Batmanaghlych	Persian: هوشنگ باتمانقلیچ		Mohammad Reza Pahlavi	Mustafa Bülent Ecevit	1978	1356
1980	1358	Parviz Mansour bestätigt	Persian: پرویز منصور مؤید		Abolhassan Banisadr	Bülent Ulusu	1980	1358
1980	1358	Reza Vaziri	Persian: رضا وزیری		Abolhassan Banisadr	Bülent Ulusu	1980	1358
1978	1356	Habiballah Asefi	Persian: حبیب‌الله آصفی		Mohammad Reza Pahlavi	Mustafa Bülent Ecevit	1978	1356
1978	1356	Mohammad Ganjidvost	Persian: محمد گنجی‌دوست		Mohammad Reza Pahlavi	Mustafa Bülent Ecevit	1978	1356
1986	1364	Manutschehr Mottaki	Persian: منوچهر متکی		Ali Khamenei	Turgut Özal	1986	1364
1990	1368	Mohammad Reza Bagheri	Persian: محمدرضا باقری		Akbar Hashemi Rafsanjani	Yıldırım Akbulut	1997	1375
1998	1376	Muhammed Hüseyin Lavasani	Persian: سید محمدحسین لواسانی		Mohammad Khatami	Mesut Yılmaz	622	
2002	1380	Firooz Dowlatabadi	Persian: فیروز دولت‌آبادی		Mohammad Khatami	Abdullah Gül	2007	1385
2008	1386	Gholamreza Bagheri Moghaddam	Persian: غلامرضا باقری مقدم		Mahmoud Ahmadinejad	Recep Tayyip Erdoğan	2010	1388
2008	1386	Bahman Hosseinpour	Persian: بهمن حسین‌پور		Mahmoud Ahmadinejad	Recep Tayyip Erdoğan	2013	1391
2013	1391	Ali Reza Bigdeli	Persian: علیرضا بیگدلی		Hassan Rouhani	Recep Tayyip Erdoğan	2016	1394
2016	1394	Mohammad Ebrahim Taherian Fard	Persian: محمدابراهیم طاهریان‌فرد		Hassan Rouhani	Binali Yıldırım	2019	1397
February 7, 2019	1397	Mohammad Farazmand	Persian: محمد فرازمند		Hassan Rouhani	Mustafa Şentop	2023	1402
July 27, 2023	1402	Mohammad Hassan Habibollahzadeh	Persian: محمدحسن حبیب الله زاده		Ebrahim Raisi	Recep Tayyip Erdoğan		
