= 2001 Iranian presidential election =

- 8 June 2001
- Registered: 42,170,230
- Turnout: 66.78% (▼13.14pp)
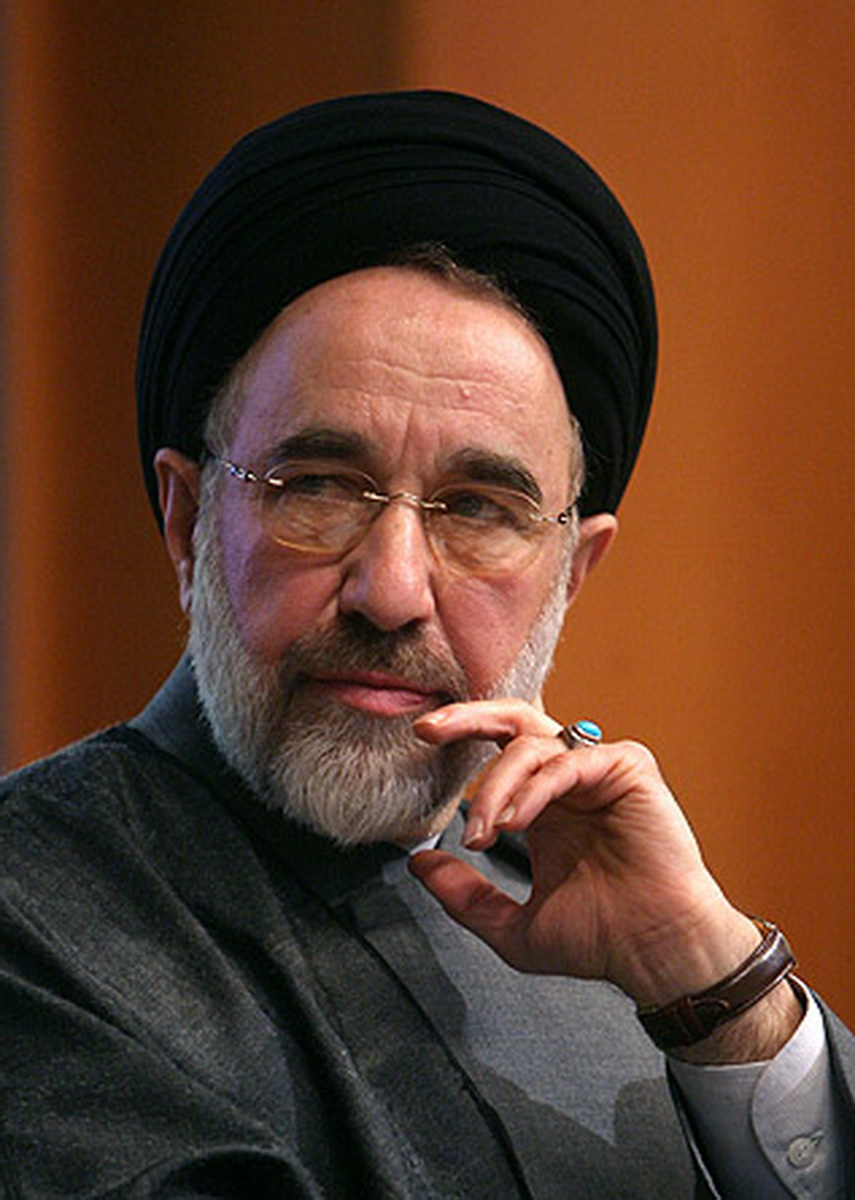

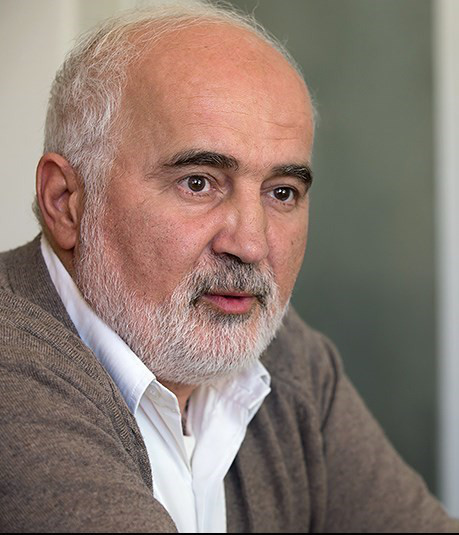
Nominee	Mohammad Khatami	Ahmad Tavakkoli
Party	ACC
Alliance	2nd of Khordad and Reformists	CCIRF and Principlists
Popular vote	21,656,476	4,387,112
Percentage	78.28%	15.86%
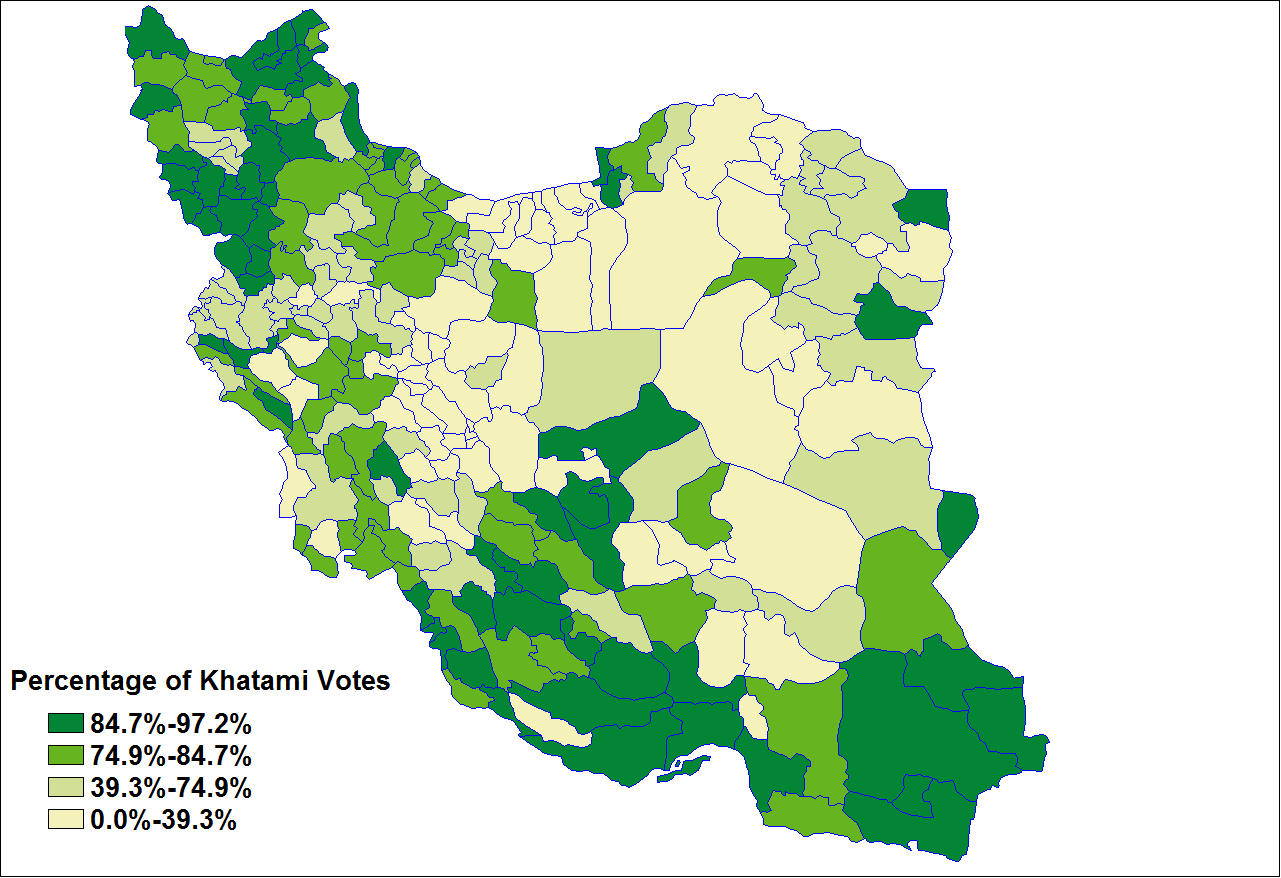
- Khatami's vote share by county
President before election
Mohammad Khatami
ACC
Elected President
Mohammad Khatami
ACC

Presidential elections were held in Iran on 8 June 2001. Incumbent president Mohammad Khatami was re-elected for a second four-year term in a landslide.

== Candidates ==
The Guardian Council has the authority to disqualify presidential candidates. Of the 814 candidates who registered for the election, the council approved only ten. Women can register because the Constitution of Iran does not specify a gender in the qualifications for president, using the "nongender-specific term rejal-i siyasi (political elite)". However, all 45 or 47 women candidates were rejected. (Six of those women were interviewed in the 2002 documentary Mrs. President: Women and Political Leadership in Iran.)

The final candidates were:

- Mohammad Khatami, incumbent President
- Ahmad Tavakkoli, former Minister of Labour and Social Affairs
- Ali Shamkhani, Minister of Defense
- Abdollah Jassbi, Chancellor of Islamic Azad University
- Mahmoud Kashani, former Iranian delegate to the International Court of Justice
- Hassan Ghafourifard, former Minister of Energy and Member of Parliament
- Mansour Razavi, member of Tehran City Council
- Shahabedin Sadr, former member of Parliament
- Ali Fallahian, former Minister of Intelligence
- Mostafa Hashemitaba, head of the Physical Education Organization

== Campaign ==
Initially, Khatami had considered not running for reelection, but after months of his supporters and party members pleading with him, he finally decided to declare his candidacy two months before the start of the election.

Central to Khatami's campaign were the issues of economic revival, job growth, and democratic reform. Khatami also sought to restore the austerity of the Iranian Revolution. According to CNN, Khatami's aides described his campaign as a "referendum for reform". Most of Khatami's nine other challengers were independent conservatives, according to the BBC.

After the scandalous final two years of his term, Mohammad Khatami was expected to be elected by a much smaller margin than in 1997. His term had been marred by the unlawful arrest of political activists, killings of Iranian dissidents, and the closure of several Iranian newspapers. Though Khatami was still believed to win by a landslide, this oppression was thought to significantly impact his performance in the election.

== Results ==
Mohammad Khatami won in a landslide even bigger than his 1997 victory, gaining 77% of the vote, as opposed to nearly 70% in 1997.

Candidate	Votes	%
Mohammad Khatami	21,656,476	78.28
Ahmad Tavakkoli	4,387,112	15.86
Ali Shamkhani	737,051	2.66
Abdollah Jassbi	259,759	0.94
Mahmoud Kashani	237,660	0.86
Hassan Ghafourifard	129,155	0.47
Mansour Razavi	114,616	0.41
Shahabedin Sadr	60,546	0.22
Ali Fallahian	55,225	0.20
Mostafa Hashemitaba	27,949	0.10
Total	27,665,549	100.00
Valid votes	27,665,549	98.25
Invalid/blank votes	493,740	1.75
Total votes	28,159,289	100.00
Registered voters/turnout	42,170,230	66.78
Source: Sahliyeh Ehteshami & Molavi

=== Turnout by province ===
Province	Electorate	Votes cast (Note: Excluding overseas voters)	Turnout
Ardabil	806,656	467,859	58.00%
East Azerbaijan	2,439,446	1,294,682	53.07%
West Azerbaijan	1,726,987	974,181	56.41%
Bushehr	512,382	365,099	71.26%
Chaharmahal and Bakhtiari	518,930	340,543	65.62%
Esfahan	2,852,882	1,735,814	60.84%
Fars	2,676,431	1,821,626	68.06%
Gilan	1,685,173	1,097,403	65.12%
Golestan	964,042	725,934	75.3%
Hamadan	1,179,237	743,372	63.04%
Hormozgan	695,182	530,336	76.29%
Ilam	325,224	250,759	77.1%
Kerman	1,411,555	998,371	70.73%
Kermanshah	1,243,128	790,685	63.6%
Khorasan	4,129,936	3,124,814	75.66%
Khuzestan	2,487,136	1,474,820	59.3%
Kohgiluyeh and Buyer Ahmad	353,054	270,417	76.59%
Kurdistan	910,364	486,596	53.45%
Lorestan	1,080,763	702,936	65.04%
Markazi	883,979	565,018	63.92%
Mazandaran	1,900,246	1,302,654	68.55%
Qazvin	670,614	500,917	74.7%
Qom	555,944	428,005	76.99%
Semnan	366,427	285,964	78.04%
Sistan and Baluchestan	1,001,596	702,444	70.13%
Tehran	7,643,471	5,202,274	68.06%
Yazd	525,981	468,982	89.16%
Zanjan	623,464	429,389	68.87%
Total	42,170,230	28,081,894	66.59%
Source: Iran Statistical Yearbook
