= Abol-Ghasem Kashani =

Iranian Ayatollah and politician (1882–1962)

The Ayatollah Sayyed Abol-Ghasem Mostafavi-Kashani
- سید ابوالقاسم کاشانی
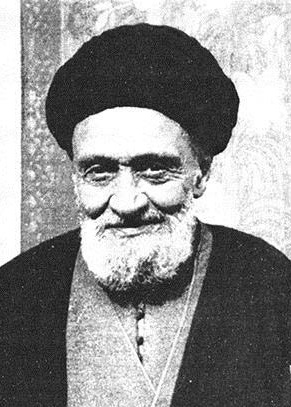

14th Chairman of the Parliament of Iran
- In office 8 August 1952 – 1 July 1953
- Monarch: Mohammad-Reza Pahlavi
- Preceded by: Hassan Emami
- Succeeded by: Abdullah Moazzami

Personal details
- Born: 19 November 1882 Tehran, Sublime State of Persia
- Died: 14 March 1962 (aged 79) Tehran, Imperial State of Iran
- Party: Society of Muslim Warriors
- Other political affiliations: National Front (1949–52)
- Children: 26

Sayyed Abol-Ghasem Mostafavi-Kashani (Persian: سید ابوالقاسم کاشانی Abu’l-Qāsem Kāšāni; 19 November 1882 – 14 March 1962) was an Iranian politician and Shia Marja. He played an important role in the 1953 coup in Iran and the overthrow of Prime Minister Mohammad Mosaddegh.

== Early life ==
His father, Ayatollah Hajj Seyyed Mostafavi Kashani (Persian: آیت‌الله حاج سید مصطفوی کاشانی), was a noted scholar of Islam in his time. Abol-Ghasem was trained in Shia Islam by his religious parents and began study of the Quran soon after learning to read and write.

At 16, Abol-Ghasem went to an Islamic seminary to study literature, Arabic language, logic, semantics and speech, as well as the principles of Islamic jurisprudence, or Fiqh. He continued his education at the seminary in Najaf in the Qur'an and Hadiths as interpreted in Sharia law, receiving his jurisprudence degree when he was 25.

== Later life ==
=== Personal life ===
Kashani had three wives and 19 children, including seven sons and 12 daughters.

His son, Mostafa, died in an accident in 1955; the newly appointed prime minister, Hossein Ala', escaped an assassination attempt at the funeral. According to British intelligence, around this time two of his sons were involved in a lucrative business buying and selling import-export licenses for restricted goods.

One of Kashani's children, Mahmoud Kashani, went on to become head of the Iranian delegation to the International Court of Justice in The Hague, Netherlands, in Iran's case with the United States and a presidential candidate in the Iranian presidential elections of 1985 and elections in 2005. His second son is Ahmad Kashani, a former member of the Iranian parliament.

=== Political life and death ===
Abol-Ghasem expressed anti-capitalist leanings from early on in his career and opposed what he saw as "oppression, despotism and colonization." Because of these beliefs, he was especially popular with the poor in Tehran. He also advocated the return of Islamic government to Iran, though this was most likely for political reasons.

Due to his pro-Nazi positions, Ayatollah Kashani was arrested and exiled by the British to Palestine in 1941. He continued to oppose foreign, especially British, control of Iran's oil industry while in exile. After he returned from exile on 10 June 1950, he continued to protest. Angered by the fact that the Anglo-Iranian Oil Company paid Iran much less than it did the British, he organized a movement against it and was the "virtually alone among the leading mujtahids in joining" nationalist Prime Minister Mohammad Mosaddegh, in his campaign to nationalize the Iranian oil industry in 1951.

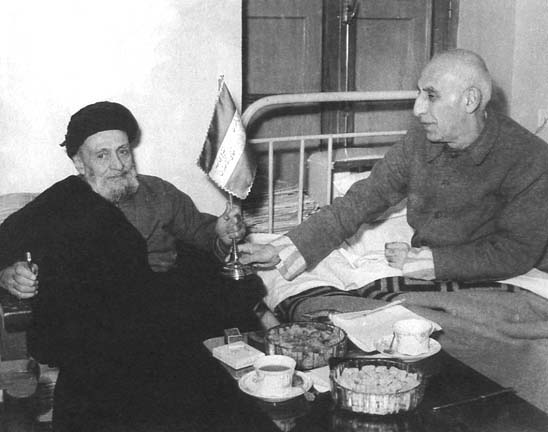
Kashani (left) and Mosaddegh (right)

Kashani served as speaker of the Majles (or lower house of Parliament), during the oil nationalization, but later turned against Mosaddeq during the 1953 Iranian coup d'état. Documents later released by the U.S. State Dept. in 2017 revealed that the American Embassy had secretly handed over large sums of money to certain influential people, to organize street protests against Masaddeq; Kashani is mentioned in passing, though is not specifically named as a recipient. His participation in rallying public support in favor of the coup is cited by others as reason to believe his involvement was secured with CIA backing.

Kashani protected the violent Islamist group Fada'iyan-e Islam, led by Navvab Safavi, after their expulsion from the Qom seminary by Ayatollah Hosein Borujerdi in 1950. The group then engaged in public assassinations in Tehran in the early 1950s. On 17 February 1956, a month after the execution of the Navvab Safavi due to his killing of senior figures Kashani confessed to an army prosecutor his role in these murders stating "I issued the Fatwa to kill Razmara, for I was a qualified Mojtahed." Then Kashani was detained and following his release from the prison he retired from politics. He died on 14 March 1962.
