= 1985 Iranian presidential election =

- 16 August 1985
- Registered: 25,993,802
- Turnout: 54.78% (▼19.48pp)
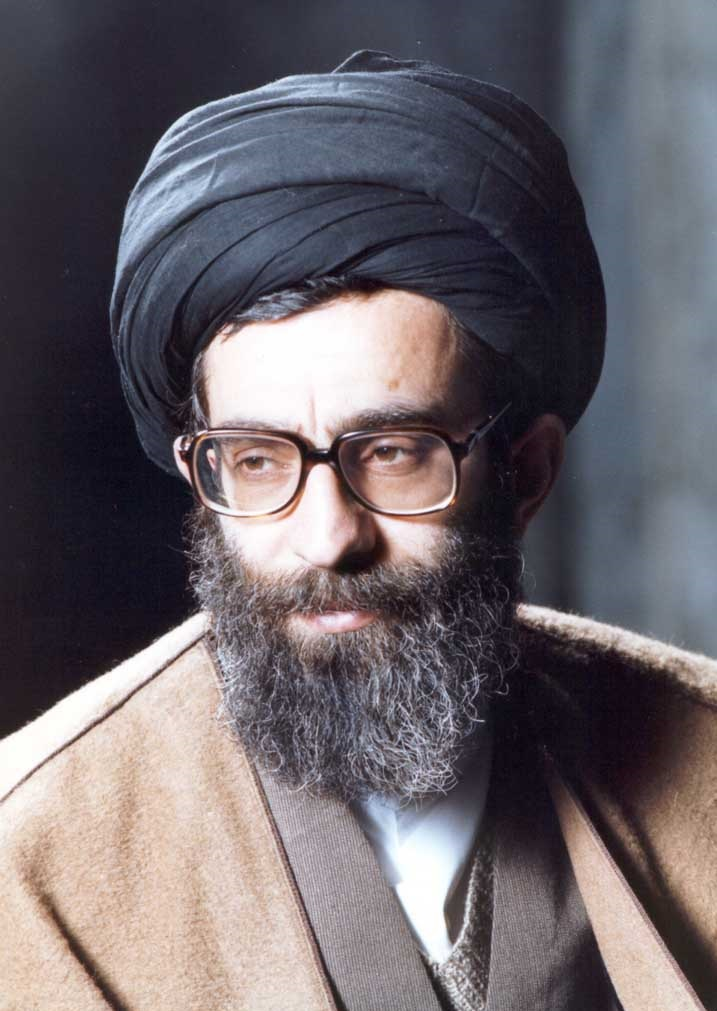

Nominee	Ali Khamenei	Mahmoud Kashani
Party	IRP	Independent
Alliance	Traditional Right (Note: Origin of the Principlists)	Traditional Right
Popular vote	12,203,870	1,402,416
Percentage	87.9%	10.1%
- Results by Province; Khamenei: 70–80% 80–90% >90%
President before election
Ali Khamenei
IRP
Elected President
Ali Khamenei
IRP

Presidential elections were held in Iran on 16 August 1985, and resulted in the re-election of the incumbent President Ali Khamenei.

== Campaign ==
Freedom Movement of Iran called for a boycott.

== Candidates ==
In July 1985, 50 people applied for the nomination, of whom only three were approved:

- Ali Khamenei, the current president and candidate of the Islamic Republic Party.
- Mahmoud Kashani, lawyer and independent candidate.
- Habibollah Asgaroladi, former Minister of Commerce and candidate of the Islamic Coalition Party

=== Disqualified ===
The following candidates were disqualified by the Guardian Council:

- Mehdi Bazargan, Secretary-General of Freedom Movement of Iran and former Prime Minister of Iran
- Mohammad Mousavi Khoeiniha
- Mohammad-Mehdi Abdekhodaei, Secretary-General of Fada'iyan-e Islam
- Babak Zahraei, Leader of Socialist Workers' Party of Iran

== Results ==
1985 Iranian presidential election
Party	Candidate	Nohen et al		ISSDP	
Party	Candidate	Votes	%	Votes	%
Islamic Republican Party	Ali Khamenei	12,203,870	87.9	12,205,012	85.00
Islamic Republican Party	Mahmoud Kashani	1,402,416	10.1	1,402,953	9.85
Islamic Republican Party	Habibollah Asgaroladi	283,297	2.00	278,113	1.95
Blank or invalid votes		355,047	2.50	352,509	2.47
Totals		14,244,630	100	14,238,587	100
