= Hossein Dadgar =

Iranian politician (1889–1971)

Hossein Dadgar Adl al-Molk
- حسین دادگر
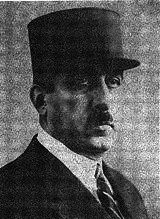

9th Speaker of the Parliament of Iran
- In office 1929–1935
- Preceded by: Hossein Pirnia
- Succeeded by: Hassan Esfandiari

Personal details
- Born: 1889
- Died: 1971 (aged 81–82)
- Resting place: Fatima Masumeh Shrine
- Occupation: Politician

Hossein Dādgar (Persian: حسین دادگر; 1889–1971), also known as Adl al-Molk (Persian: عدل‌الملک), was an Iranian politician.

He entered politics in the cabinet of Sayyed Ziya in 1921, as a member of Zia's Committee of Iron. He eventually became Parliament (Majlis) speaker for four periods.
