= Hassan Esfandiari =

Iranian politician (1867–1945)

Hassan Esfandiari Mohtashem os-Saltaneh
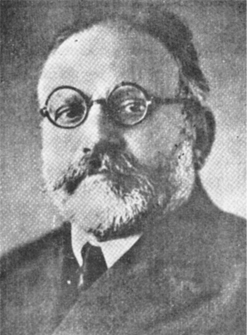

10th Speaker of the Parliament of Iran
- In office 1935–1943
- Preceded by: Hossein Dadgar
- Succeeded by: Mohammad Sadeq Tabatabai'

Personal details
- Born: 1867
- Died: 1945 (aged 77–78)
- Occupation: Politician

Mirza Hassan Khan Esfandiary (Persian: میرزا حسن‌خان اسفندیاری; 1867–1945), also known as Mohtashem os-Saltaneh (Persian: محتشم‌السلطنه), was an Iranian politician, and the 10th chairman of the Iranian parliament during the Pahlavi era. He became Member of Parliament from Tehran and Mazandaran from 1934 to 1945. He was a minister in several cabinets of Iranian Prime ministers. He was part of the Iranian noble Esfandiari Noor family.

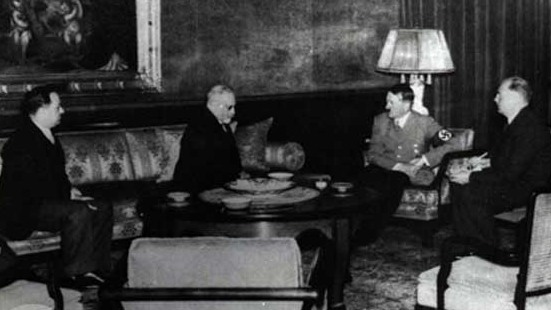
Hassan Esfandiary and Mussa Nuri Esfandiari, Iranian ambassador to the German Reich meeting Adolf Hitler

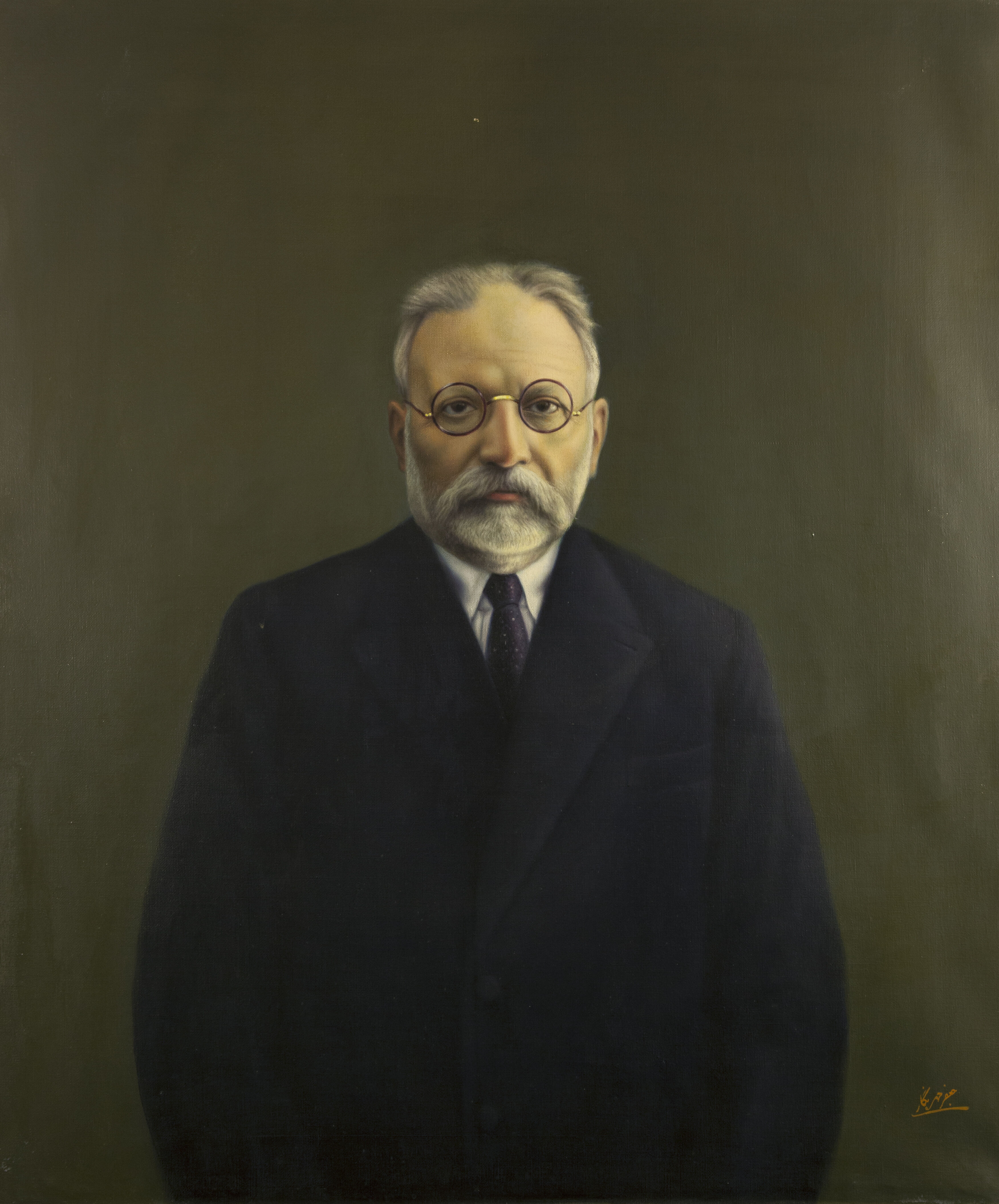
Portrait of Esfandiari by Jafar Chehrenegar

Preceded by Hossein Dadgar	Speaker of Parliament; 1934–1945	Succeeded by Seyed Mohammad Sadeq Tabatabai'
