= Mahmoud Kashani =

Iranian politician and academic

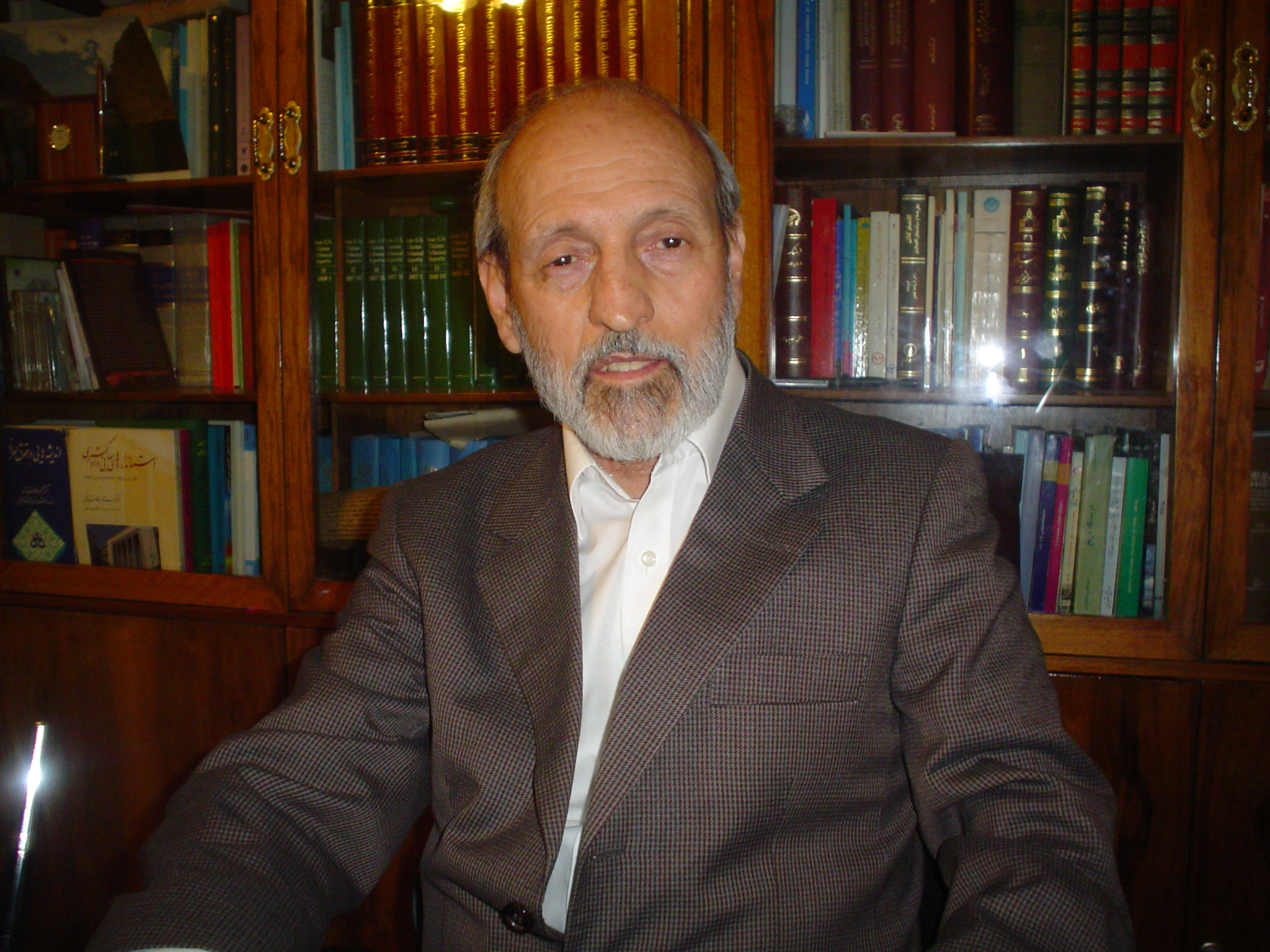
- Born: 6 June 1942 (age 84); Tehran, Iran
- Education: University of Tehran
- Political party: Islamic Republican Party (1979–1987)

Sayyid Mahmoud Kashani (Persian: سید محمود کاشانی) (born 6 June 1942) is an Iranian politician, academic, writer and lawyer. He is also a professor in Shahid Beheshti University. He was head of the Iranian delegation to the International Court of Justice in The Hague, Netherlands from 1981 to 1985. He was also a presidential candidate in the 1985 and 2001 elections.

== Early life and family ==
He was born on 6 June 1942 in Tehran, Iran. His father, Abol-Ghasem Kashani was a prominent Twelver Shia Muslim cleric and former chairman of the parliament. He is also older brother of Ahmad Kashani, a former member of the parliament.

== Political career ==
Kashani founded Islamic Republican Party with Mohammad Beheshti and Mohammad-Javad Bahonar and was secretary-general of the party from 1979 to 1981. He was appointed as head of the Iranian delegation to the International Court of Justice in Iran's case with the United States in December 1981 by then-Prime Minister Mohammad-Ali Rajai but was removed from his position by Mir-Hossein Mousavi. He was independent candidate in 1985 presidential election which receives 1,402,416 (10.1%) of the votes behind winner Ali Khamenei. He was also nominated in 2001 presidential election which he lost to Mohammad Khatami and was ranked as the 5th out of 10 candidates.

== See also ==
- Islamic Republican Party
- International Court of Justice
