= Imam of Friday Prayer =

Person who conducts the Friday prayer in Shia Islam and preaches related sermons

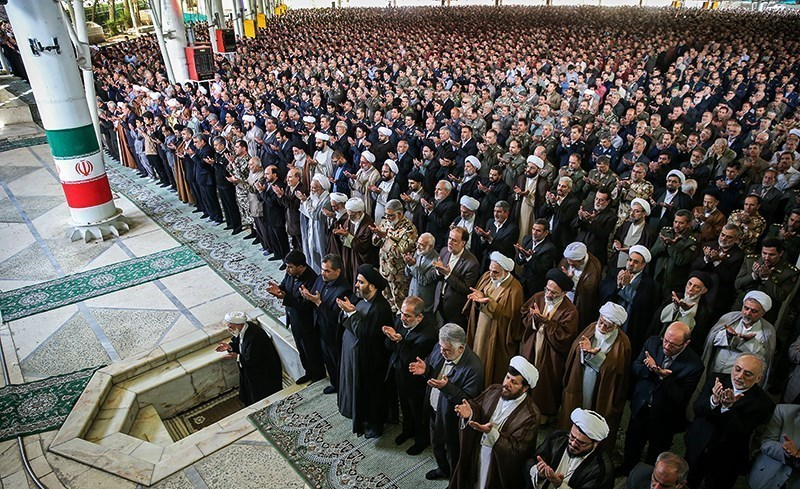
Ayatollah Ahmad Jannati (in sunken niche) acts as Tehran's Friday Prayer Imam (2016).

The Imam of Friday Prayer (Arabic: امام صلاة الجمعة), or Imam Jom'a (Jumu'ah), is the person who conducts the Friday prayer in Islam and preaches related sermons.

== Qualifications to serve ==
An Imam of Friday Prayer is expected to be distinguished for intellect ('Aql), faith (Iman), and righteousness. Traditionally, a Friday prayer imam must be male and, according to some, also of legitimate birth. Moreover, it is recommended (Mustahab) that the imam be eloquent, brave, watchful of prayer times, and true in his speech.

There are many rulings (Ahkam) regarding the Friday prayer that are common across the various branches and schools of Islam, but there are differences when it comes to qualifications. For instance, while there is a consensus about the five conditions—adulthood, intellect, correctness in reciting, and not otherwise excluded—there are disagreements as to the requirement to be a Mo'men (believer).

== Infallible imams ==
Historically in Shi'a Islam, when an infallible imam (Ma'sum) is present, the position of Friday Imam is assumed by him or someone he appoints.

== Temporary imams ==
The permanent Imam Jom'a of a city may appoint others to this office in a temporary capacity.

== See also ==
- Salah al jama'ah
- Friday prayer
- List of Tehran's Friday Prayer Imams
- Imam
