= Reza Hekmat =

12th Speaker of the Parliament of Iran (1947–1952; 1953–1963)

Reza Hekmat Sardar Fakher
- رضا حکمت
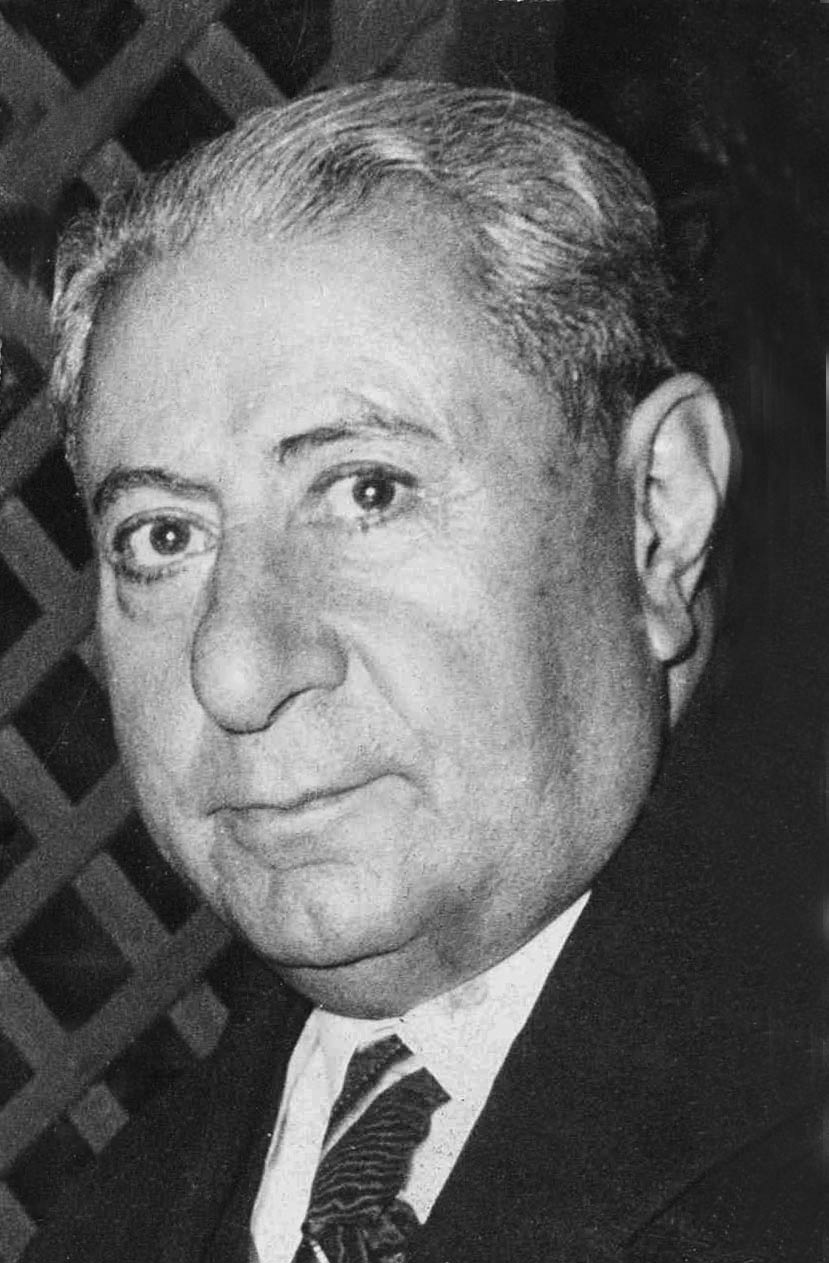

12th Speaker of the Parliament of Iran
- In office 16 August 1953 – 5 August 1963
- Preceded by: Abdollah Moazemi
- Succeeded by: Abdollah Riazi
- In office 25 March 1947 – 1 July 1952
- Preceded by: Mohammad-Sadegh Tabatabaei
- Succeeded by: Abol-Ghasem Kashani

Personal details
- Born: 1891 Shiraz, Sublime State of Iran
- Died: 15 March 1978 (aged 86–87) Tehran, Imperial State of Iran
- Party: Democratic Party of Iran (1946–1948)
- Children: 2

Reza Hekmat (Persian: رضا حکمت; 1891 – 15 March 1978), also known as Sardar Fakher (Persian: سردار فاخر), was a speaker of Parliament of Iran from 1947 to 1952 and 1953 to 1963.

Hekmat was the Prime Minister of Iran from 18 December to 29 December 1947, but he resigned from the prime ministership before the formation of the government, for this reason, he is not included in the Prime Ministers of Iran.

He was born in Shiraz in 1891 and died in Tehran in 1978 at the age of 87. Some sources claim that Hekmat’s paternal family were Iranian Jews who had converted to Islam during the mid-nineteenth century.

== See also ==
- Pahlavi dynasty
- List of prime ministers of Iran

Political offices
Preceded by Ahmad Qavam	Prime Minister of Iran; 1947	Succeeded by Ebrahim Hakimi
Assembly seats
Preceded by Mohammad Sadeq Tabatabai'	Chairman of the Parliament of Iran; 1947–1955	Succeeded by Abol-Ghasem Kashani
