= Sadegh Sadegh =

Iranian politician (died 1952)

Mirza Sadegh Sadegh
- صادق صادق
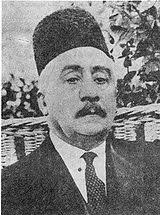

4th Speaker of the Parliament of Iran
- In office 15 November 1909 – 4 July 1910
- Preceded by: Esmail Momtaz
- Succeeded by: Mohammad-Ali Foroughi

Speaker of the 1st Constituent Assembly
- In office 6 December 1925 – 13 December 1925

Member of Senate
- In office 22 January 1950 – 7 December 1952
- Appointed by: Mohammad Reza Pahlavi
- Constituency: Azerbaijan

Member of Parliament
- In office 15 November 1909 – 25 December 1911
- Constituency: Tabriz
- In office 7 October 1906 – 23 June 1908
- Constituency: Tabriz

Minister of Education and Endowments
- In office 30 April 1924 – 8 August 1925
- Monarch: Ahmad Shah Qajar
- Prime Minister: Reza Khan

Ambassador of Iran to Republic of Turkey
- In office 1931–1936
- Monarch: Reza Shah Pahlavi

Personal details
- Died: 7 December 1952
- Party: Democrat

Sadegh Sadegh (Persian: صادق صادق; died 7 December 1952), also known by the inherited bestowed title Mostashar od-Dowleh (Persian: مستشارالدوله), was an Iranian diplomat and constitutionalist politician.
