= Mohammed Emami-Kashani =

Iranian Ayatollah (1931–2024)

Mohammad Emami-Kashani
- محمد امامی کاشانی
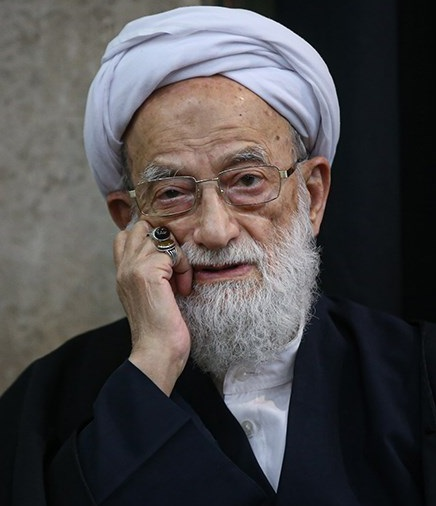
- Emami-Kashani in 2019

Member of the Assembly of Experts
- In office 15 August 1983 – 2 March 2024
- Constituency: Tehran province
- Majority: 2,286,483

Tehran's Ephemeral Friday Prayer Imam
- In office 30 October 1981 – 2 March 2024
- Appointed by: Ruhollah Khomeini

Personal details
- Born: 3 October 1931 Kashan, Persia
- Died: 2 March 2024 (aged 92) Tehran, Iran
- Party: Combatant Clergy Association

Mohammad Emami-Kashani (Persian: محمد امامی کاشانی; 3 October 1931 – 2 March 2024) was an Iranian politician who was a member of the Assembly of Experts of the Islamic Republic of Iran. He was the Interim Friday Prayer Leader of Tehran. He was also the head of Shahid Motahari University, Tehran.

Emami-Kashani called al-Qaeda an "illegitimate child of America and Israel":

You talk about al-Qaeda. Have you forgotten who has bred al-Qaeda? It's the illegitimate child of America and Israel, but you name it Islam. This savagery is not Islam. It is coming from inside of you and it is now punching you.

== Death ==
Born on 3 October 1931, he died on 2 March 2024, at the age of 92.

== References and notes ==
Party political offices
Preceded by Mohammad-Reza Mahdavi Kani	Secretary-General of the Combatant Clergy Association (Acting); 1996	Succeeded by Mohammad-Reza Mahdavi Kani
