= The Shah Is Gone =

Headline from the Iranian Revolution

Front cover of Ettela'at, 16 January 1979

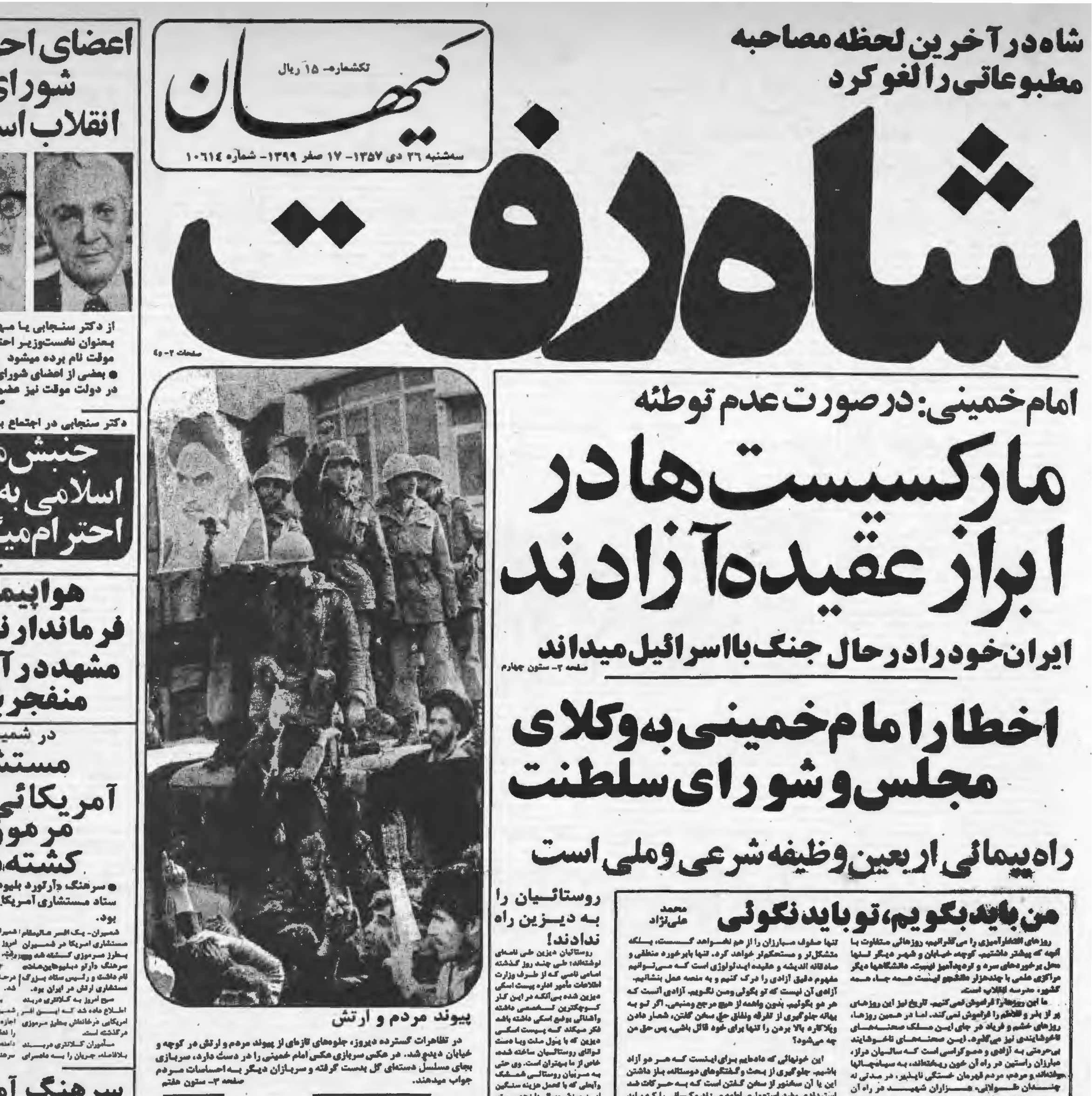
Front cover of Kayhan with the same headline

"The Shah Is Gone" (Persian: شاه رفت, romanized: Šâh raft) is a headline that appeared on the front cover of the Iranian newspaper Ettela'at on Tuesday, 16 January 1979, when the Shah left Iran, a few days before the fall of the Pahlavi dynasty and the 2,500-year-old Iranian monarchy. The title contains the word shah (king) instead of shahanshah (king of kings) to refer to Mohammad Reza Pahlavi, which was very rare during his reign. It is described as the "most famous headline in the history of Iran".

== See also ==
- Iranian Revolution
