= Fada'iyan-e Islam =

Shia fundamentalist group/political party in Iran

Society of Fadayeen Islam جمعیت فدائیان اسلام
- General Secretary: Mohammad-Mehdi Abdekhodaei
- Founder: Navab Safavi
- Founded: 1946
- Legalised: 2 July 1989
- Headquarters: Qom and Tehran
- Newspaper: Manshoor-e-Baradari
- Membership (1949): <100
- Ideology: Islamism; Islamic fundamentalism Islamic revivalism Guardianship of the Islamic Jurist
- Religion: Shia Islam
- Slogan: Persian: اسلام برتر از همه چیز است و هیچ چیز برتر از اسلام نیست "Islam is above anything and nothing is above Islam"

Party flag
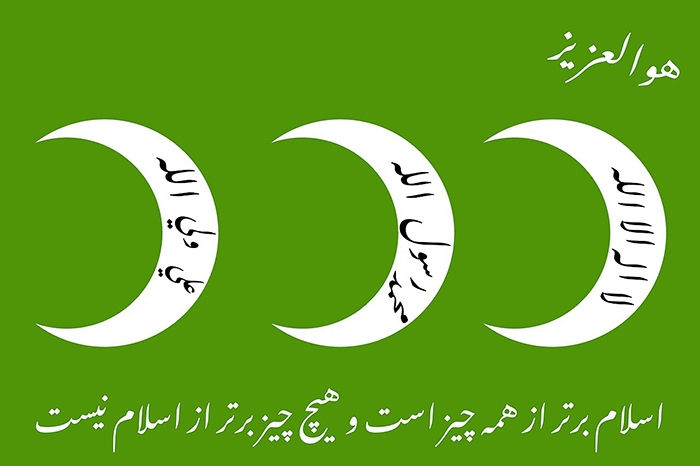

Website
- www.fadaeian.ir

Fadayan-e Islam (Persian: فدائیانِ اسلام; English; "Fedayeen of Islam" or "Self-Redeemers of Islam") is a Shia fundamentalist group in Iran with a strong activist political and terrorist orientation. The group was founded in 1946, and registered as a political party in 1989. It was founded by a theology student, Navvab Safavi. Safavi sought to purify Islam in Iran by ridding it of 'corrupting individuals' by means of carefully planned assassinations of certain leading intellectual and political figures.

The group executed a series of assassinations (author Ahmad Kasravi, court minister (and former prime minister) Abdolhossein Hazhir, the Prime Minister Haj Ali Razmara, the former education minister Abdul Hamid Zangeneh) and attempted assassinations (the Shah of Iran, and foreign minister Hossein Fatemi) and succeeded in saving some of its assassins from punishment with the help of the group's powerful clerical supporters. Eventually the group was suppressed and Safavi was executed by the Iranian government in the mid-1950s. The group survived as supporters of the Ayatollah Khomeini and the Iranian Revolution.

== Background ==
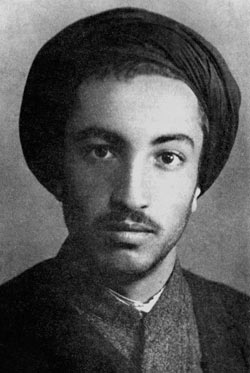
Navvab Safavi, founder of the Fadayan-e Islam

The group was part of a "growing nationalist mobilization against foreign domination" in the Middle East after World War II, and has been said to presage more famous Islamist terrorist groups. Its membership is said to have been made up of youth employed in "the lower echelons of the Tehran bazaar." Its program went beyond generalities about following the sharia to demand prohibitions of alcohol, tobacco, opium, films, gambling, wearing of foreign clothing, the enforcement of amputation of hands of thieves, and the veiling of women, and an elimination from school curriculum of all non-Muslim subjects such as music.

== History ==
In a 1945 declaration, Navvad Safavi stated:

We are alive and God, the revengeful, is alert. The blood of the destitute has long been dripping from the fingers of the selfish pleasure seekers, who are hiding, each with a different name and in a different colour, behind black curtains of oppression, thievery and crime. Once in a while the divine retribution puts them in their place, but the rest of them do not learn a lesson. … Damn you! You traitors, imposters, oppressors! You deceitful hypocrites! We are free, noble and alert. We are knowledgeable, believers in God and fearless.

=== Rise ===
Its first assassination was of a nationalist, anti-clerical author named Ahmad Kasravi, who was stabbed and killed in 1946. Kasravi is said to have been the target of Ayatollah Khomeini's demand in his first book, Kashf al Asrar (Key to the Secrets), that "all those who criticized Islam" are mahdur ad-damm, (meaning that their blood must be shed by the faithful). Secularist Iranian author Amir Taheri argues that Khomeini was closely associated with Navvab Safavi and his ideas, and that Khomeini's assertion "amounted to a virtual death sentence on Kasravi."

Hussein Emami, the assassin and a founding member of the Fada'iyan, was promptly arrested and sentenced to death for the crime. The Iranian intelligentsia united in calling for an example to be made of him. Emami, however, was spared the gallows. According to Taheri, he roused religious defenders and used his prestige as a seyyed, or descendant of the Islamic prophet Muhammad, to demand he be tried by a religious court. Khomeini and many of the Shia clergy pressured the Shah to give Emami a pardon, taking advantage of the Shah's political difficulties at that time, such as the occupation of Azerbaijan province by Soviet troops. Khomeini himself asked the Shah for the pardon.

In November 1949 the group killed court minister (and former prime minister) Abdolhossein Hazhir. On 7 March 1951, the Prime Minister Haj Ali Razmara was assassinated, in retaliation for his advice against nationalizing the oil industry. Three weeks later the former education minister Abdul Hamid Zangeneh was assassinated by the group. Razmara's assassination was said to have moved Iran "further away from a spirit of compromise and moderation in relation to the oil problem" and "so frightened the ruling classes that concession after concession was made to nationalist demands in an attempt to pacify the intensely aroused public indignation." An assassination attempt on Shah Mohammad Reza Pahlavi, on 4 February 1949, was carried out by Fakhr-Arai; Fakhr-Arai was first attributed to be a member of the communist Tudeh Party of Iran, but he was later found to more likely be a religious fundamentalist member of Fada'iyan-e Islam.

In addition to Emami, Khalil Tahmasebi, the assassin of Razmara, was also pardoned by the Iranian Parliament during the premiership of Mohammad Mossadegh. Ayatollah Abol-Ghasem Kashani, a powerful member of parliament and a supporter of the Fadayan, "arranged for a special Act to be passed quashing the death sentence on Tahamsebi and declaring him (Tahamsebi) to be a soldier of Islam," to the further consternation of Iranian secularists. However, following the fall of Mossaddegh Tahmasebi was arrested again and tried in 1952. He was sentenced to death and executed in 1955. In addition, Ayatollah Kashani ended his alliance with Mossadegh and become close to the Shah after the assassination.

Although the Fada'iyan strongly supported the nationalization of Iran's foreign-owned oil industry, they turned against the leader of the nationalization movement, Mohammad Mossadeq, when he became prime minister, because of his refusal to implement sharia law and appoint strict Islamists to high positions. The Fada'iyan attempted to assassinate Mossadeq and the danger from the Fada'iyan "was one of the primary factors accounting for Mosaddeq's decision to move the prime minister's office to his own residence." Another assassination attempt on 15 February 1952 badly wounded Hossein Fatemi, "Mosaddeq's dynamic and capable aide" and foreign minister. That left Fatemi "badly wounded and effectively disabled for almost eight months." The attempted assassination was planned by the group's second in command, Abolhossein Vahedi, and carried out by a teenage member of the group.

After the coup that removed Mosaddeq, Safavi congratulated the Shah:

The country was saved by Islam and with the power of faith ... The Shah and prime minister and ministers have to be believers in and promoters of, Shi'ism, and the laws that are in opposition to the divine laws of God … must be nullified. … The intoxicants, the shameful exposure and carelessness of women, and sexually provocative music … must be done away with and the superior teachings of Islam … must replace them. With the implementation of Islam's superior economic plan, the deprivation of the Muslim people of Iran, and the dangerous class difference would end.

In the years to follow, he enjoyed a close association with the government. In 1954, he attended the Islamic Conference in Jordan and traveled to Egypt. There he learned about Hasan al-Banna, the founder of Muslim Brotherhood (Arabic: الإخوان المسلمين), who was killed by Egyptian government in 1949, and met Sayyid Qutb.

==== Conflict with ulama ====
Safavi was not supported by the ulama and the Shia Marja, Ayatullah Hossein Borujerdi, rejected his ideas, questioning him about robberies that his organization committed on gun point. Safavi replied:

Our intention is to borrow from people. What we take is for establishing a government based on the model of Imam Ali's government. Our goal is sacred and prior to these tools. When we established an Aliid government-like state, then we give people their money back.

Fada'ian-e Islam launched a campaign of character assassination against the Marja and reportedly called for excommunication of Borujerdi and the defrocking of religious scholars who opposed the campaign of the Fada'iyan. Navvab safavi didn't like Broujerdi's idea of Shia-Sunni rapprochement (Persian: تقریب), he advocated Shia-Sunni unification (Persian: وحدت) under Islamist agenda.

=== Crackdown ===
In 1955, Navvab Safavi and "other members of the Fedayeen of Islam, including Emami," were finally executed. The group continued however, turning, according to author Baqer Moin, to Ayatollah Khomeini as a new spiritual leader, and reportedly being "reconstructed" by Khomeini disciple, and later controversial "hanging judge", Sadegh Khalkhali. It is thought to have carried out the assassination of Iranian Prime Minister Hassan Ali Mansour in 1965. Mansour is reported to have been "tried" by a secret Islamic court, made up of Khomeini followers Morteza Motahhari and Ayatollah Mohammad Beheshti, and sentenced to death "on a charge of 'warring on Allah' as symbolized by the decision" to send Khomeini into exile. The three men who carried out the "sentence" – Mohammad Bokara'i, Morteza Niknezhad and Reza Saffar-Harandi – "were arrested and charged as accomplices", but the story of both the trial and the sentence was not revealed until after the revolution.

=== Khomeini ===
The organization dispersed but after the death of Ayatullah Borujerdi, the Fada'ian-e Islam sympathizers found a new leader in Ayatullah Ruhollah Khomeini who appeared on political horizon through the June 1963 riots in Qom. In 1965, prime minister Hassan Ali Mansur was assassinated by the group.

=== Revolution and Islamic Republic ===
After the 1979 Iranian Revolution and establishment of the Islamic Republic of Iran, there were "three abortive attempts" made by "old members or sympathizers" of the Fada'ian to restore the organization.

1. by Ṣādeq Ḵalḵālī with ʿAbd-Allāh Karbāsčīān;
2. by Moḥammad-Mahdī ʿAbd-e Ḵodāʾī, Shaikh Moḥammad-ʿAlī Lavāsānī, and Jawād Wāḥedī;
3. by Abu’l-Qāsem Rafīʿī, a former security chief of the Fada'ian.

According to Farhad Kazemi of Iranica, "the main carriers" of the Fedāʾīān’s legacy in the Islamic Republic, are the Coalition of Islamic Associations, which "grew from the former members and sympathizers" of the Fedāʾīān who have developed connections to "Ayatollah Khomeini and his lieutenants since 1963".

== See also ==
- Terrorism in Iran
