= Mahabad (electoral district) =

Constituency of the Iranian parliament

- Electoral district constituency for the West Azerbaijan
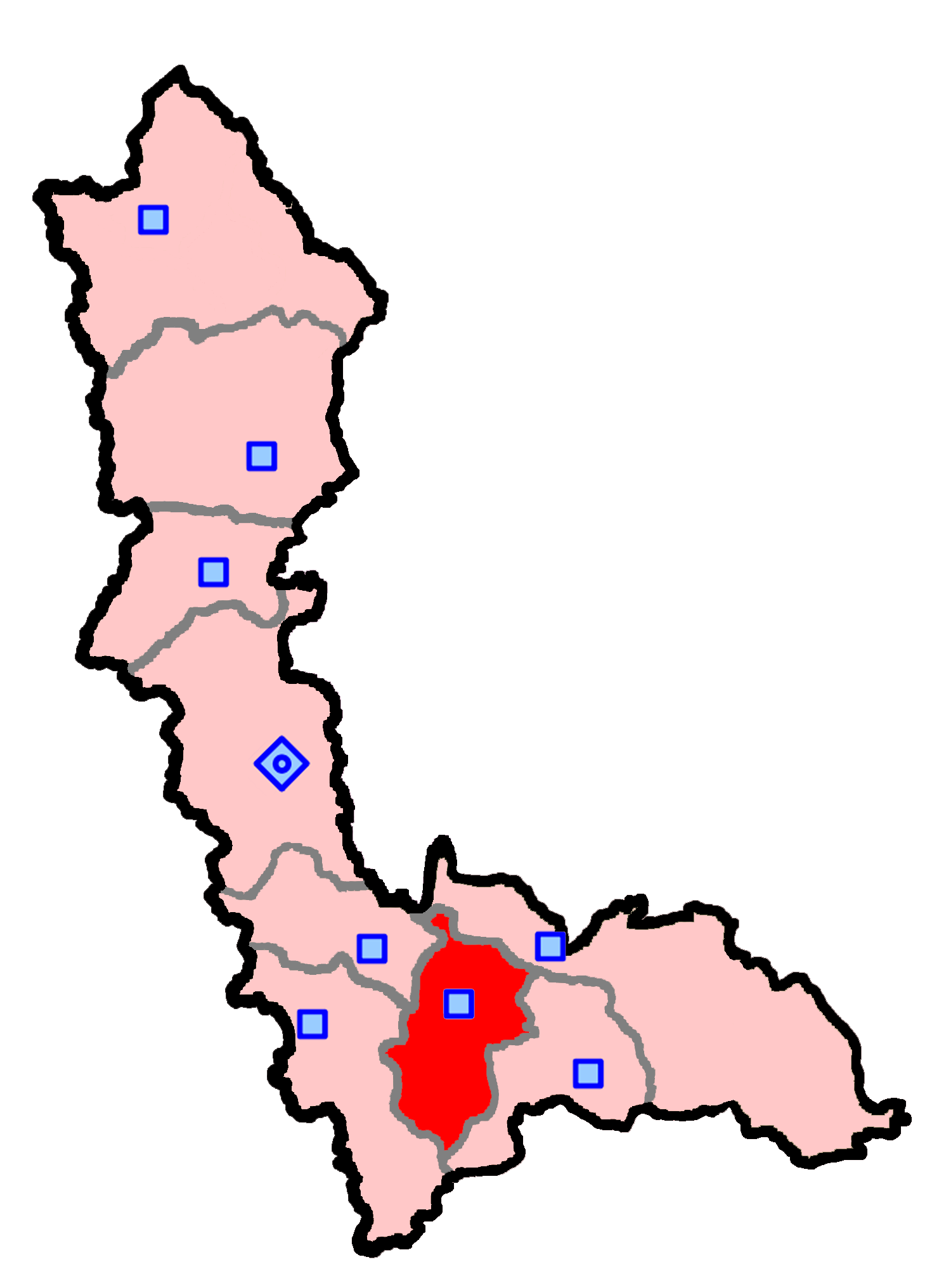
- Mahabad shown within West Azerbaijan Province
- West Azerbaijan Province: Mahabad County

Current constituency
- Assembly Members: Jalal Mahmoudzadeh

Mahabad is the 7th electoral district in the West Azerbaijan Province of Iran. It has a population of 215,529 and elects 1 member of parliament.

== 1980 ==
MP in 1980 from the electorate of Mahabad. (1st)

- No MP

== 1984 ==
MP in 1984 from the electorate of Mahabad. (2nd)

- Ahad Anjiri

== 1988 ==
MP in 1988 from the electorate of Mahabad. (3rd)

- Mohammad Hosseini

== 1992 ==
MP in 1992 from the electorate of Mahabad. (4th)

- Abdolrahin Nurbakhsh

== 1996 ==
MP in 1996 from the electorate of Mahabad. (5th)

- Abdolrahin Nurbakhsh

== 2000 ==
MP in 2000 from the electorate of Mahabad. (6th)

- Rahman Behmanesh

== 2004 ==
MP in 2004 from the electorate of Mahabad. (7th)

- Jafar Aeinparast

== 2008 ==
MP in 2008 from the electorate of Mahabad. (8th)

- Jalal Mahmudzadeh

== 2012 ==
MP in 2012 from the electorate of Mahabad. (9th)

- Osman Ahadi

== 2016 ==
Iranian legislative election, 2016
#	Candidate	List(s)	Votes	%
	Jalal Mahmoudzadeh	Independent politician	46,856	
