= Mohammad-Hassan Aboutorabi Fard =

Iranian cleric and politician

Hojjat-ol Eslam Seyyed Mohammad-Hassan Aboutorabi Fard
- محمدحسن ابوترابی‌فرد
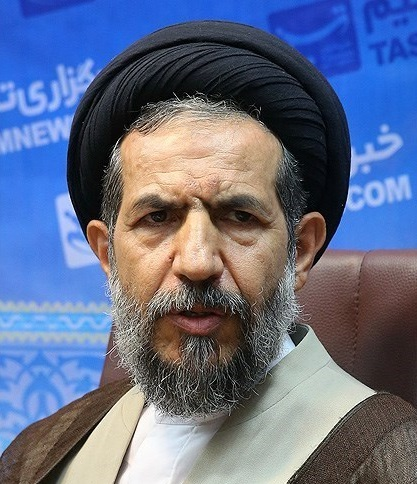

Tehran's Ephemeral Friday Prayer Imam
- Incumbent
- Assumed office 14 February 2018
- Appointed by: Ali Khamenei

First Deputy Speaker of the Parliament of Iran
- In office 28 May 2012 – 28 May 2016
- Preceded by: Mohammad-Reza Bahonar
- Succeeded by: Masoud Pezeshkian
- In office 31 May 2008 – 31 May 2011
- Preceded by: Mohammad-Reza Bahonar
- Succeeded by: Mohammad-Reza Bahonar

Member of the Parliament of Iran
- In office 28 May 2004 – 28 May 2016
- Constituency: Qazvin (2004–2012); Tehran, Rey, Shemiranat and Eslamshahr (2012–2016)
- Majority: 693,384 (29.69%)

Personal details
- Born: January 30, 1953 (age 73) Qom, Iran
- Party: Combatant Clergy Association
- Education: Imam Khomeini University

Mohammad-Hassan Aboutorabi Fard (Persian: محمدحسن ابوترابی‌فرد; born January 30, 1953) is an Iranian principlist politician and a former first deputy speaker of the Parliament of Iran. He was the representative of Qazvin from 2004 to 2012 and of Tehran from 2012 until 2016.

Assembly seats
Preceded by Mohammad-Reza Bahonar	1st Vice Speaker of Parliament of Iran; 2008–2011; 2012–2016	Succeeded by Mohammad-Reza Bahonar
Preceded by Mohammad-Reza Bahonar	1st Vice Speaker of Parliament of Iran; 2008–2011; 2012–2016	Succeeded by Masoud Pezeshkian
Preceded by Ali Shakouri-Rad	2nd Vice Speaker of Parliament of Iran; 2004–2008	Succeeded by Mohammad-Reza Bahonar
