= Imamzadeh Saleh, Shemiran =

Iranian shrine and mosque

Imāmzādeh Sāleh امامزاده صالح
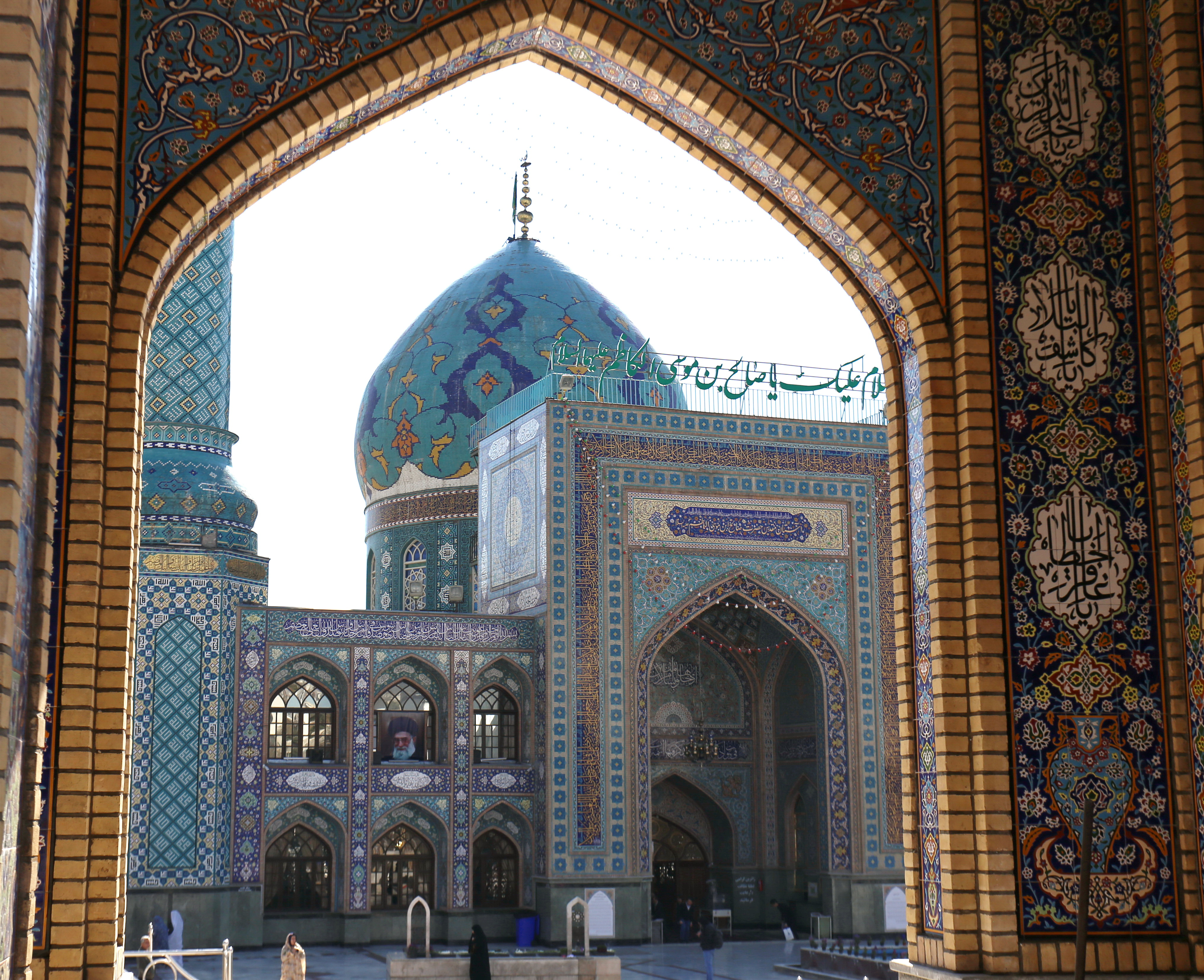

- Location within Iran

Religion
- Affiliation: Islam
- Province: Tehran Province

Location
- Location: Shemiran, Iran
- Municipality: Shemiranat County
- Coordinates: 35°48′18.43″N 51°25′47.4″E

Architecture
- Type: Mosque

Imamzadeh Saleh (Persian: امامزاده صالح, romanized: Imāmzādeh Ṣāleh) is a imamzadeh mosque in Tehran, Iran. The mosque is located at Tajrish Square in Tehran's northern Shemiran district. It entombs the remains of Saleh, a son of the Seventh Shia Imam, Musa al-Kazim, and is one of the most popular Shia shrines in northern Tehran. It is a holy site in Shia Islam.

== Design ==
The main mausoleum building includes a large rectangular building with thick walls and solid inner space of almost 5.6 square meters.

Silver enshrines the eastern and northeastern and western sides, decorated with silver and wood lattice on the south side of the endowment of the late Mirza Saeed Khan foreign minister for the late Qajar.

== History ==
In 700 AH Imam Zadeh Saleh an inscription appears in the repair and alteration of entries according to which the Kingdom of Ghazan Khan was at the same time.

In 1210 AH and the name of Fath-Ali Shah Qajar has been engraved on it.

== Notable burials ==
- Mirza Nasrollah Khan Moshir od-Dowleh (1840–1907), prime minister (1906–07)
- Hassan Pirnia Moshir od-Dowleh (1871–1935), scholar and prime minister (1918–20), (1922) and (1923)
- Hossein Pirnia Mo'tamen ol-Molk (1874–1946), speaker of the Majles (1914–25) and (1927–28)
- Mohammad Tadayyon (1881–1951), statesman
- Majid Shahriari (1966–2010), engineer
- Masoumeh Ghavi (1987–2020), Telecom Engineer, Innocent victim of Ukraine International Airlines Flight 752
- Mahdieh Ghavi (1999–2020), Medical Student, Innocent victim of Ukraine International Airlines Flight 752

== Memorial Day ==
The custodians of Saleh Imamzadeh appointed 5 Dhiqaadah (24 March) on the day of commemoration of this Imamzadeh. The commemoration ceremony of Imamzadeh is held every year in 24 March in Astan.

== Ghavi Sisters Tomb ==
Masoumeh Ghavi with her sister, Mahdieh Ghavi, rest in the yard of Imamzadeh Saleh – Tajrish. The sisters were killed in the Islamic Revolutionary Guard Corps's (IRGC) attack on Ukraine International Airlines Flight 752 on the morning of January 8.

== Gallery ==
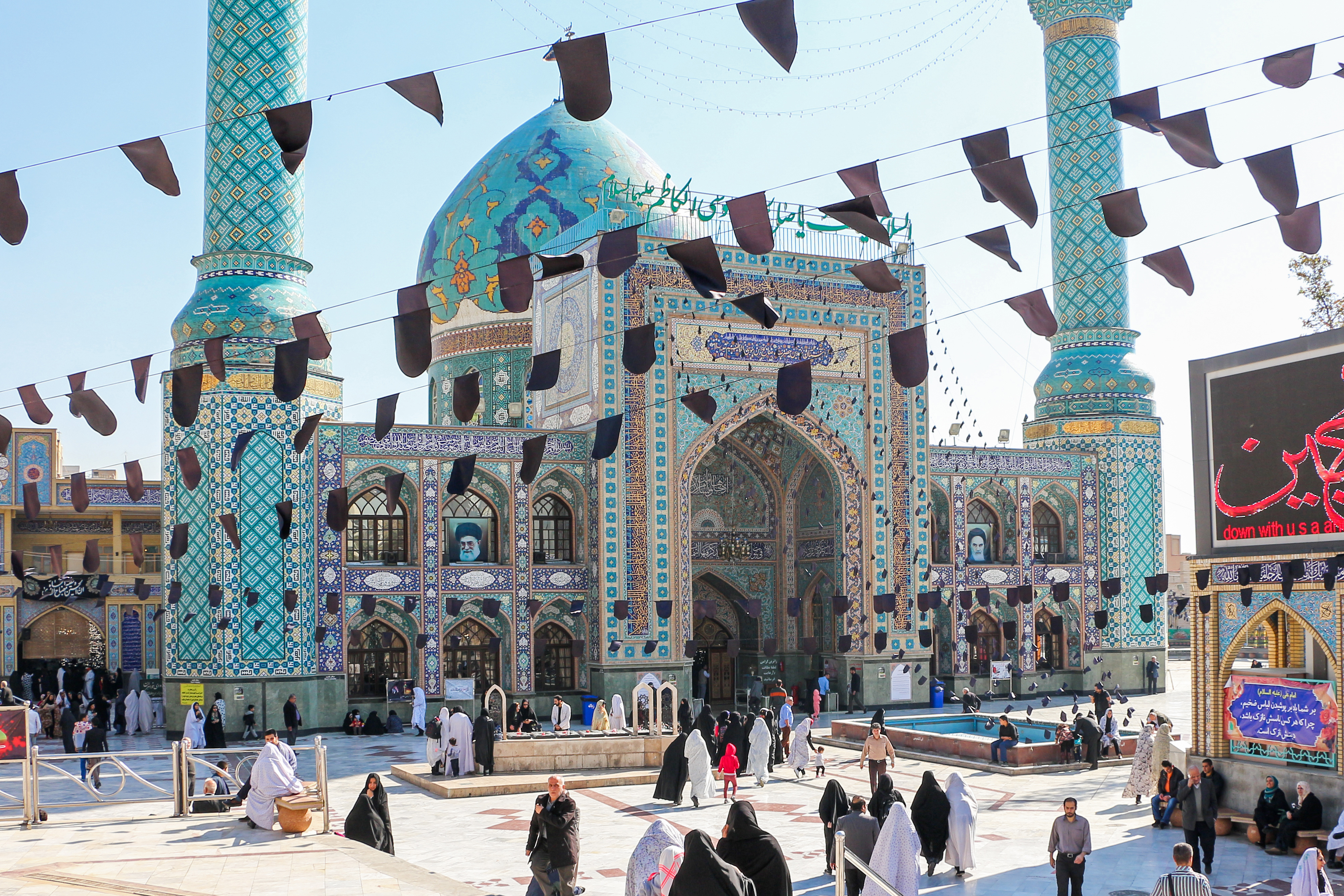
Main building

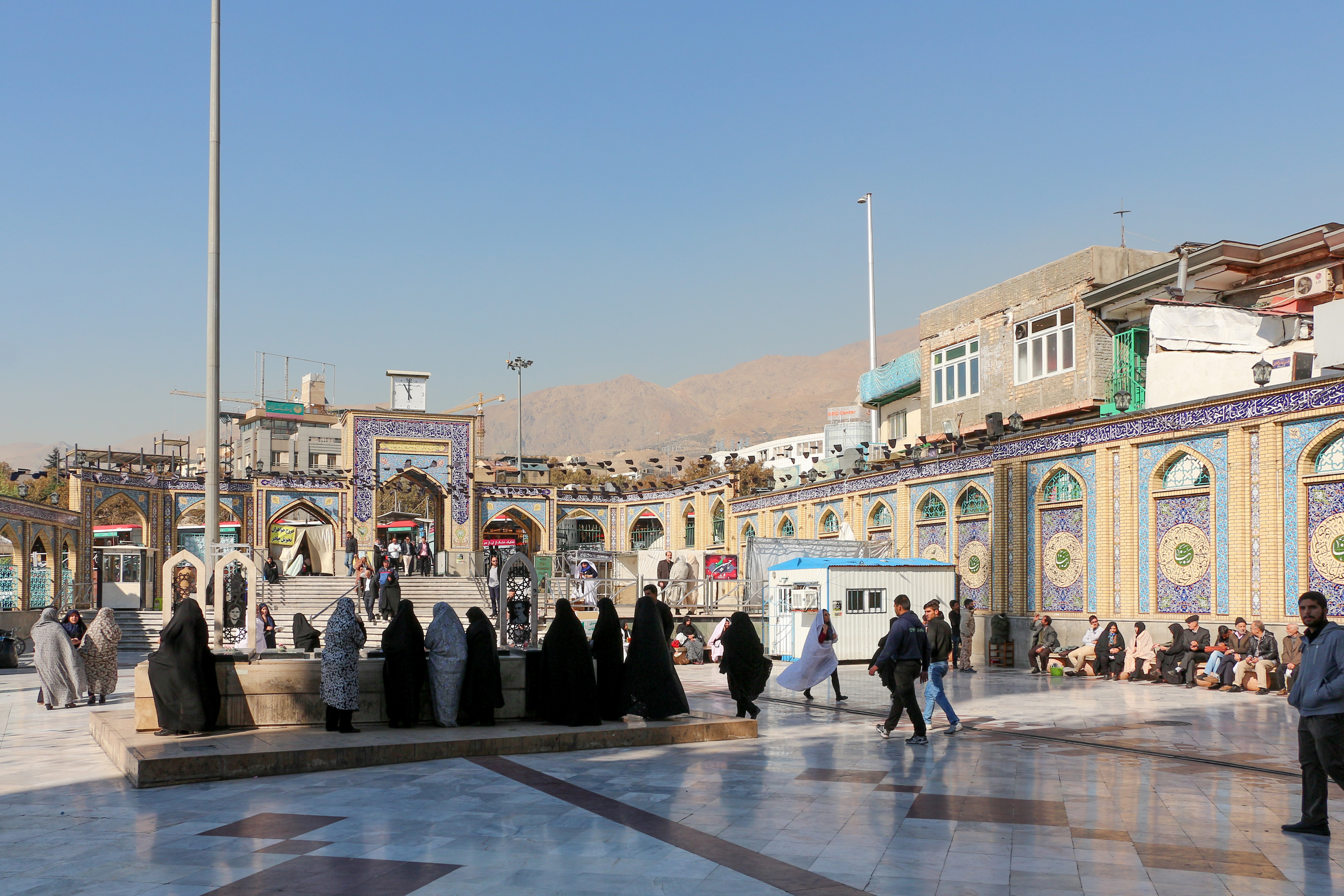
Courtyard

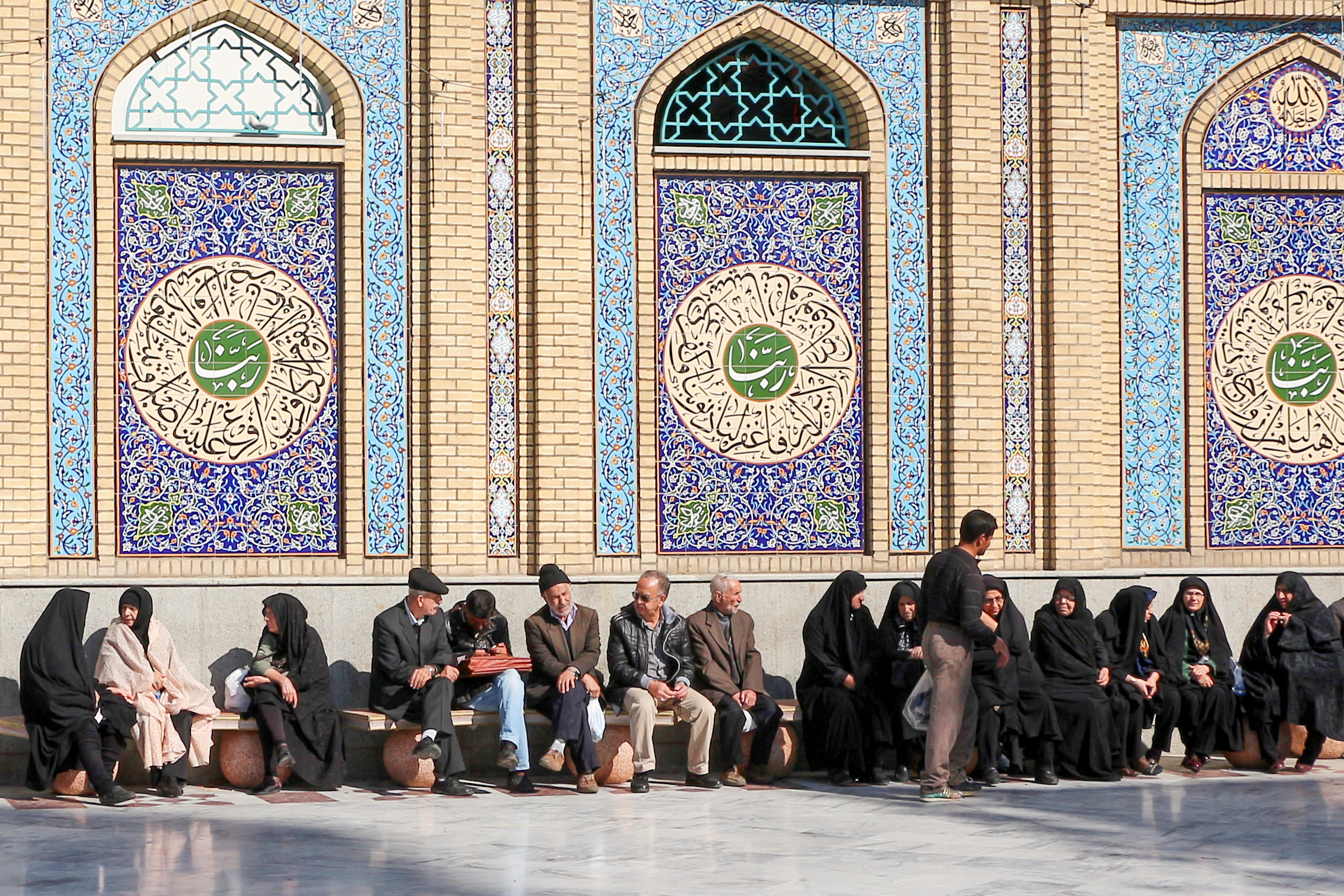
In the courtyard

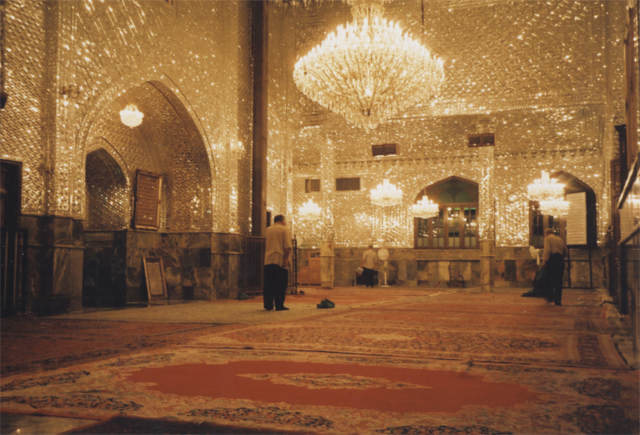
Interior

== See also ==
- List of mosques in Iran
- Imamzadeh
