= Mirza Nasrullah Khan =

Iranian politician (1840–1907)

Mirza Nasrollah Pirnia Moshir od-Dowleh
- نصرالله پیرنیا
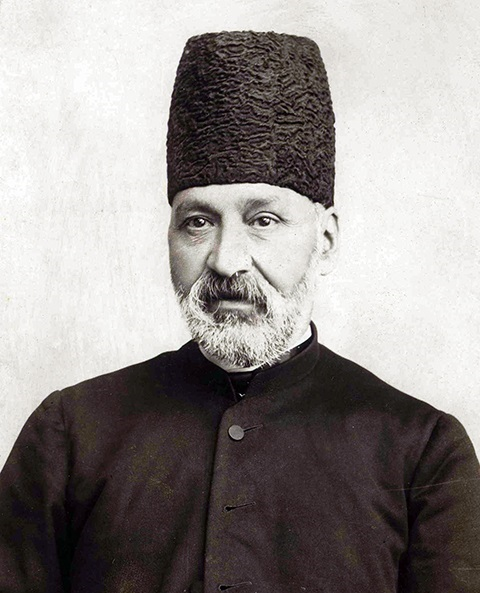
- Formal portrait c. 1900–1907

Premier of Iran
- In office 30 July 1906 – 10 March 1907
- Monarchs: Mozaffar ad-Din Qajar; Mohammad Ali Qajar
- Preceded by: Abdol Majid Mirza (as Premier of Persia)
- Succeeded by: Soltan-Ali Vazir-e Afkham

Minister of Foreign Affairs
- In office 9 August 1899 – 29 July 1906
- Monarch: Mozaffar ad-Din Qajar
- Premier: Ali Asghar Atabak; Abdol Majid Mirza
- Preceded by: Mirza Mohsen Khan Moshir od-Dowleh
- Succeeded by: Mohammad-Ali al-Saltaneh

Personal details
- Born: 17 October 1840 Nain, Qajar Iran
- Died: 13 September 1907 (aged 66) Tehran, Qajar Iran
- Resting place: Imamzadeh Saleh
- Party: Independent
- Spouse: Hosnieh Ghods-e Dowleh
- Children: Hassan; Hossein; Ali; Zahra

Nasrollah Pirnia, also known as Mirza Nasrollah Khan Naini (Persian: میرزا نصرالله خان نائینی; 17 October 1840 – 13 September 1907), titled Moshir od-Dowleh (Persian: مشیرالدوله), was the first Iranian prime minister. He became Premier of Iran following the introduction of the Persian Constitution of 1906, establishing Iran's first legitimate government approved by the Majlis on 7 October 1906. Before becoming prime minister, he had served as the minister of foreign affairs. He died in circumstances said to be suspicious and was buried in Imamzadeh Saleh of Tajrish.

Moshir ad-Dowleh Mansion belonged to him and his children.

== Early life ==
Born in 1840 to a family of religious leaders, he grew up in Nain before later travelling to Tehran. In 1862, he married Hosnieh, daughter of a wealthy merchant named Mirza Taghi Ajudan. Two of their children, Hassan and Hossein, would later draft the Persian Constitution of 1906 and play key roles in Iranian politics during the late Qajar era. Nasrollah, working his way up through the ranks of government, became the Minister of Foreign Affairs in 1898.

== Premier ==
Nasrollah became the premier of Iran under the new Iranian Constitution of 1906. Although he resigned on 17 March 1907, his cabinet remained in place until 1 May 1907. After Nasrollah's death, his eldest son Hassan Pirnia inherited the title of Moshir od-Dowleh before also serving as prime minister the following decade.

== Sources ==
- Jane Lewisohn, Flowers of Persian Song and Music: Davud Pirniā and the Genesis of the Golhā Programs, Journal of Persianate Studies, Vol. 1, No. 1, pp. 79–101 (2008)

Political offices
Preceded by Abdol Majid Mirza	Minister of Foreign Affairs; 1899–1906	Succeeded by Mirza Abdulvahab Khan
Preceded by None	Prime Minister of Iran; 1906–1907	Mirza Ali Asghar Khan Amin al-Soltan
