= Mohammad Tadayyon =

Iranian politician (1881–1951)

Seyyed Mohammad Tadayon
- محمد تدین
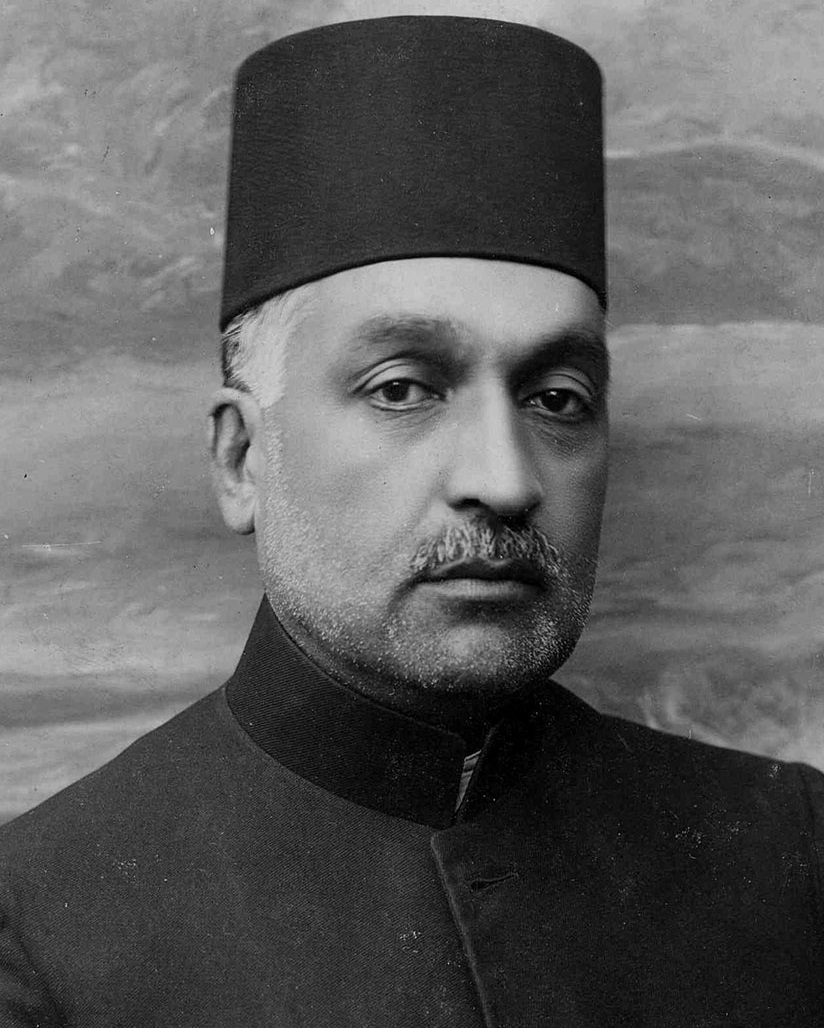

Member of the Senate of Iran
- In office 22 January 1950 – 16 November 1951
- Constituency: Mashhad

8th Speaker of the Parliament of Iran
- In office 11 July 1926 – 13 February 1927
- Preceded by: Hassan Mostofi
- Succeeded by: Hossein Pirnia

Member of the Parliament of Iran
- In office 11 July 1926 – 8 February 1927
- Monarch: Reza Shah
- Constituency: Birjand
- In office 11 February 1924 – 11 February 1926
- Monarchs: Reza Shah; Ahmad Shah Qajar
- Constituency: Birjand

Minister of Interior
- In office 15 July 1943 – 1944
- Prime Minister: Ali Soheili

Minister of Supplies
- In office 4 March 1943 – 15 July 1943
- Prime Minister: Ali Soheili

Minister without portfolio
- In office 17 February 1943 – 4 March 1943
- Prime Minister: Ali Soheili

Minister of Education
- In office 4 December 1941 – 9 March 1942
- Prime Minister: Mohammad-Ali Foroughi
- In office 8 February 1927 – 8 January 1928
- Prime Minister: Hassan Mostofi; Mehdi Qoli Hedayat

Governor of Kerman Province
- In office 1928–1929

Personal details
- Born: 1881 Bahlgerd, Sublime State of Iran
- Died: 16 November 1951 (aged 69–70) United States
- Resting place: Shemiran, Iran
- Party: Revival Party (1920s); Democrat Party (1910s)
- Occupation: Educator

Mohammad Tadayon (Persian: محمد تدین; 1881 – 16 November 1951) was an Iranian politician. He held several government offices including minister of education, minister without portfolio, minister of supplies, and minister of interior. Tadayyon also served as a lawmaker and senator.
