= Moshir ad-Dowleh Mansion =

Historic building in Tehran, Iran

- عمارت مشیرالدوله
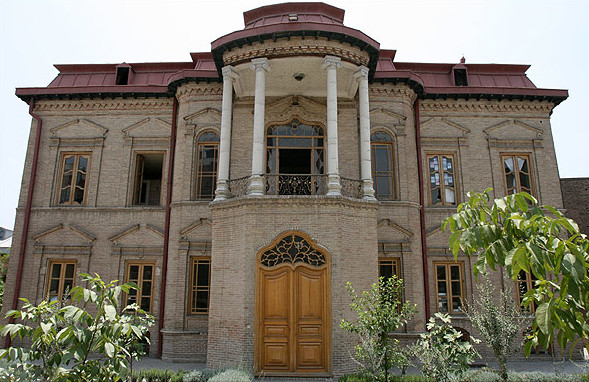
- Interactive map of the Moshir ad-Dowleh Mansion area

General information
- Architectural style: Qajar style
- Location: Tehran, Iran

Design and construction
- Architect: Nikolai Markov

The Moshir ad-Dowleh Mansion (Persian: عمارت مشیرالدوله) is a historic mansion in Tehran, Iran. It belonged to the Qajar era politician Hassan Pirnia. In 1906, the declaration of the Persian Constitution was written here by Mirza Nasrullah Khan, Hassan Pirnia's father.

The films Hezar Dastan and Chess of the Wind were partly filmed in this mansion.

It was listed in the national heritage sites of Iran with the number 1899 on 2 August 1997.

== Gallery ==
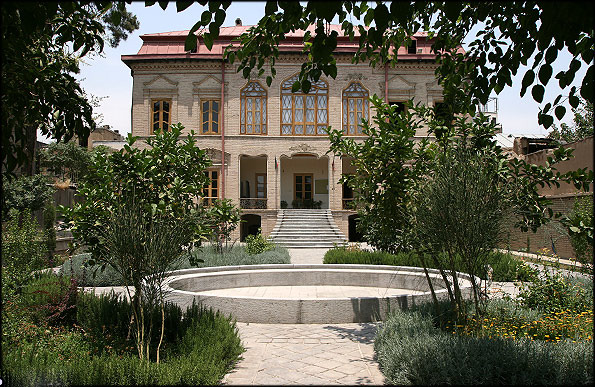
The southern facade

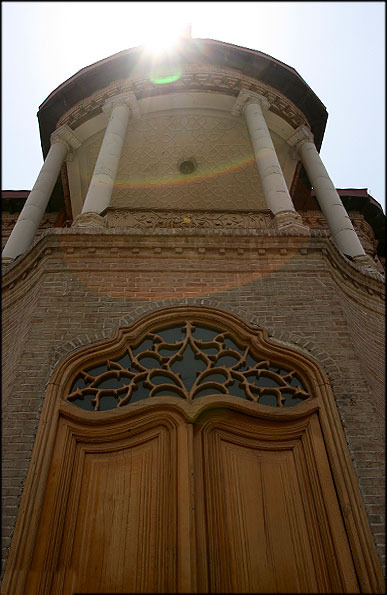
The main entrance

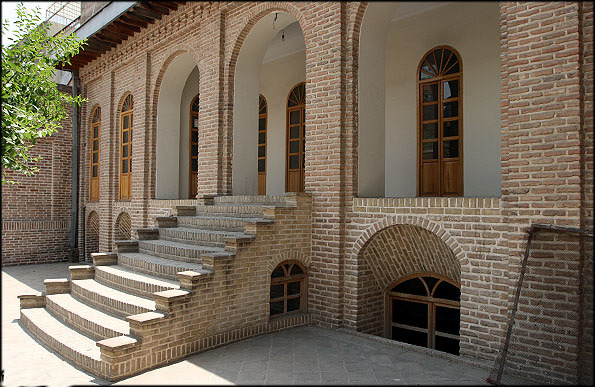
The andaruni of the mansion

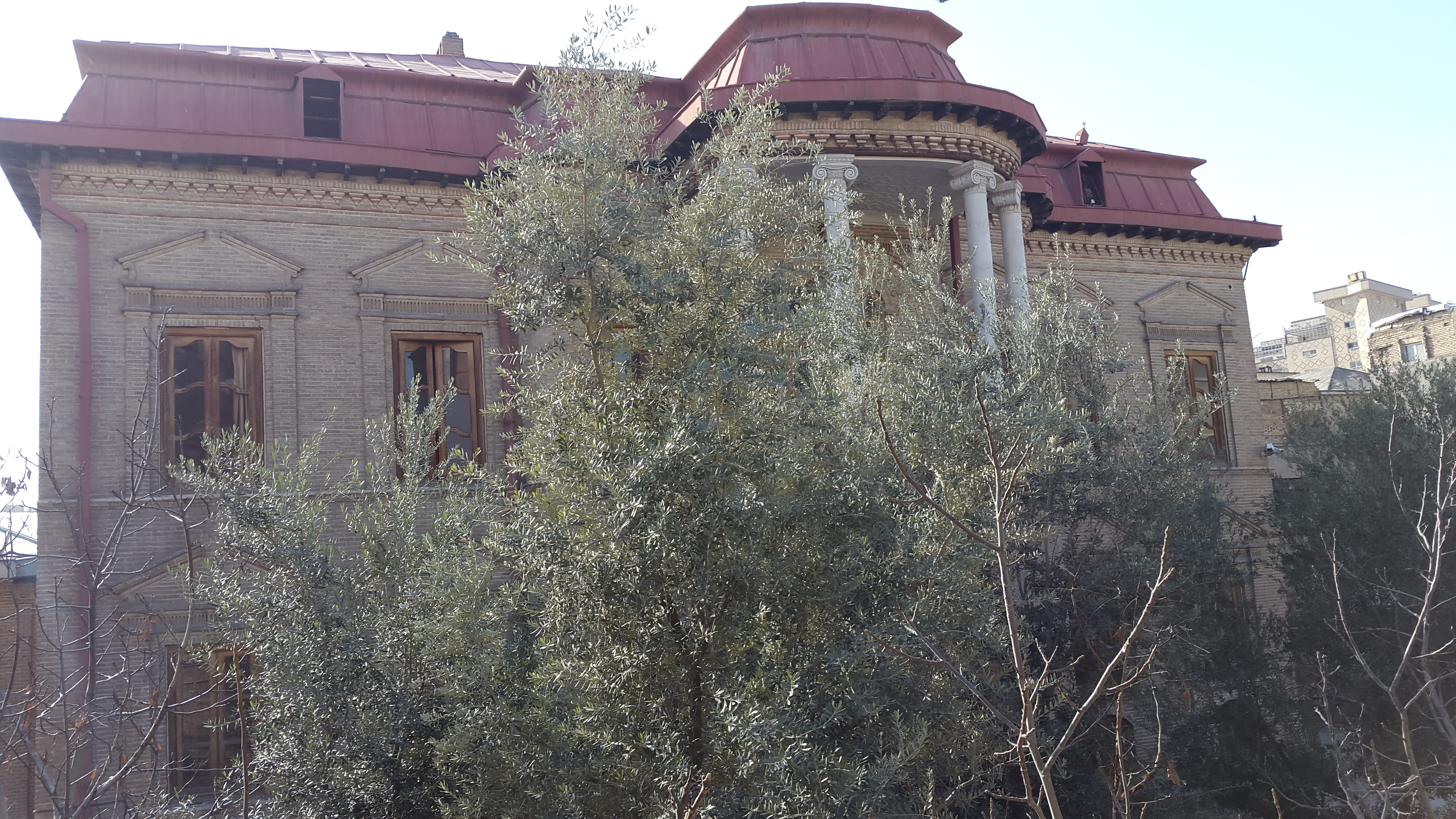
The northern facade
