= Ali-Akbar Davar =

Iranian politician (1885-1937)

- علی‌اکبر داور
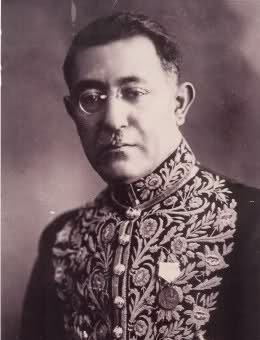

Minister of Justice
- In office 13 June 1926 – 18 September 1933
- Monarch: Reza Shah
- Prime Minister: Hassan Mostowfi; Mehdi Qoli Hedayat
- Preceded by: Vossug ed Dowleh
- Succeeded by: Mohsen Sadr

Minister of Education
- In office 1 November 1925 – 13 June 1926
- Monarch: Reza Shah
- Prime Minister: Mohammad Ali Foroughi

Personal details
- Born: 1885 Tehran, Sublime State of Iran
- Died: 10 February 1937 (aged 52) Tehran, Imperial State of Iran

Ali-Akbar Dāvar (Persian: علی‌اکبر داور, also known as Mirza Ali-Akbar Khan-e Dāvar (میرزا علی‌اکبرخان داور); 1885 – 10 February 1937) was an Iranian politician and judge, and the founder of the modern judicial system of Iran.

== Early life and education ==
Ali-Akbar Davar was born in 1885 in Tehran. His father, Kalbali Khan Khazen al Khalvat, was a minor court official during the reign of Mozaffar ad-Din Shah Qajar. In 1900, Davar enrolled in the élite school of Dar ul-Funun to study medicine; however, he changed his field of study to law and graduated from the University of Geneva receiving a degree in law in 1908.

== Legal and political career ==
In 1909, he began his career in the judiciary in Iran as a judge in the provincial court. Davar rose the ranks quickly and in 1910 became the public prosecutor of Tehran. He then went on to obtain his law degree in Switzerland. He returned to Iran in 1921 and founded the "Radical party of Iran" (Hezb-e Radical). He also founded the newspaper Mard-e Azad ("The Free Man") in which he published regular comments. He was elected to the 4th, 5th, and 6th Majles as the representative of Varamin from Tehran province and Lar from Fars province.

Along with contemporaries such as Abdolhossein Teymourtash and Farman Farmaian, Dāvar took a lead role among the politicians who voted for the abolition of the Qajar dynasty, opposing such parliamentarians as Sayyed Hasan Taqizadeh, Sayyed Hassan Modarres, Yahya Doulatabadi and Mohammad Mosaddegh. In 1925, Dāvar became the minister of commerce in the Foroughi Cabinet, and a year later was appointed minister of judicial affairs in the Cabinet of Mostowfi ol-Mamalek. In March 1926, with the approval of parliament, he dissolved Iran's entire judiciary, initiating a wave of fundamental restructuring and overhauling reforms with the aid of French judicial experts.

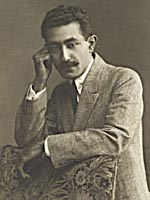
The young Ali-Akbar Dāvar.

Iran's modern judicial system was born in April 1927 with 600 newly appointed judges in Tehran. Dāvar subsequently attempted to expand the new system into other cities of Iran through a programme involving training of 250 judges.

In December 1936, he proposed a bill to Majles that would seal a large contract with two American companies. The bill came under heavy protest from the British and the Russian governments, putting intense pressure on Dāvar's ministry.

== Death ==
On 10 February 1937, Dāvar died and the news of his apparent suicide took the capital, Tehran, by storm. Rumors spread that two days earlier Dāvar had been in private severely reprimanded and threatened by Reza Shah. Some newspapers wrote that he had died of a heart attack, however others suggested that his death had been related to his proposed American bill to Majlis. Davar is said to have died by an overdose of opium.

Four years before, in 1933, Reza Shah had arrested Davar's closest friend Teymourtash. Teymourtash died shortly afterward in prison. Many say he was killed by the prison's physician through lethal injection on orders of Reza Shah—a method widely used at the time.

== Legacy ==
Among Dāvar's many achievements are establishing Iran's "Bureau of Social Affairs" (Edareh-ye Sabt-e Ahval), introducing "The Law of Documentation Registration" (Qanun-e Sabt-e Asnad), "The Law of Property Registration" (Qanun-e Sabt-e Amlak), and "The Law of Marriage and Divorce" (Qanun-e Ezdevag va Talāq).

Dāvar also implemented some reforms as minister of finance in the Cabinet of Mohammad Ali Foroughi. He further established Iran's first state insurance company in the Cabinet of prime minister Mahmoud Djam, taking effective steps in saving the state from near bankruptcy by modifying the tax laws.

Dāvar is regarded as one of the most productive ministers during Iran's tumultuous years of the early 20th century, who made sweeping reforms to Iran's judicial system. In commemorating Dāvar, Reza Shah is said to have told members of the Judiciary: "Don't ever think that you can become as good as Dāvar, by merely sitting in his chair".

== Source used for this article ==
- 'Alí Rizā Awsatí (عليرضا اوسطى), Iran in the past three centuries (Irān dar Se Qarn-e Goz̲ashteh – ايران در سه قرن گذشته), Vol. 2 (Paktāb Publishing – انتشارات پاکتاب, Tehran, Iran, 2003). ISBN 964-93406-5-3.
