= Fathollah Khan Akbar =

Iranian Prime Minister (1855–1937)

- فتح‌الله خان اکبر
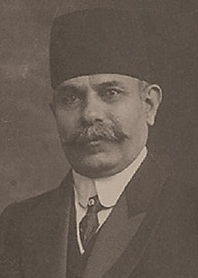

13th Prime Minister of Iran
- In office 16 October 1920 – 21 February 1921
- Monarch: Ahmad Shah Qajar
- Preceded by: Hassan Pirnia
- Succeeded by: Zia'eddin Tabatabaee

Personal details
- Born: 1855 Rasht, Gilan, Qajar Iran
- Died: March 1937 (age 81–82) Tehran, Pahlavi Iran
- Resting place: Ibn Babawayh Cemetery
- Party: Independent

Fathollah Khan Akbar (Persian: فتح‌الله خان اکبر; 1855 – 1937) was an Iranian politician who served as the 13th Prime Minister of Iran serving from October 1920 to February 1921. He was Minister of Justice in several Iranian Cabinets and was a representative of Iranian Parliament from Gilan. He was deposed in the 1921 coup, which he secretly supported, led by Reza Khan.

Fathollah Khan Akbar was a strong supporter of the Persian Constitutional Revolution. He was imprisoned for financially aiding those who were fighting for a constitutional monarchy. A staunch patriot, he refused to implement Iran's 1919 agreement with the British Government during his time as prime minister. The 1919 agreement was a one-sided agreement that only would benefit Britain and in response to his refusal and his loyalty to his country, the British referred to him as an "incompetent" prime minister.

== See also ==
- Qajar dynasty
- List of prime ministers of Iran

== References used ==
The following reference was used for the above writing: 'Alí Rizā Awsatí (عليرضا اوسطى), Iran in the Past Three Centuries (Irān dar Se Qarn-e Goz̲ashteh - ايران در سه قرن گذشته), Volumes 1 and 2 (Paktāb Publishing - انتشارات پاکتاب, Tehran, Iran, 2003). ISBN 964-93406-6-1 (Vol. 1), ISBN 964-93406-5-3 (Vol. 2).

== Sources ==
- Ardakani, Hossein Mahboubi (1984). "Akbar, Fatḥallāh". In Yarshater, Ehsan (ed.). Encyclopædia Iranica (Online ed.). Encyclopædia Iranica Foundation. ISBN 978-0710090997.
- Ghani, Cyrus (1998). Iran and the Rise of the Reza Shah: From Qajar Collapse to Pahlavi Power. I.B. Tauris. ISBN 978-1860646294.

Political offices
Preceded by Hassan Pirnia	Prime Minister of Iran; 1920–1921	Succeeded by Zia'eddin Tabatabaee
