= Faculty of Law and Political Science, University of Tehran =

Law school of the University of Tehran

Coordinates: 35.7028°N 51.3943°E

Faculty of Law and Political Science at the University of Tehran
- دانشکده حقوق و علوم سیاسی دانشگاه تهران (Persian)
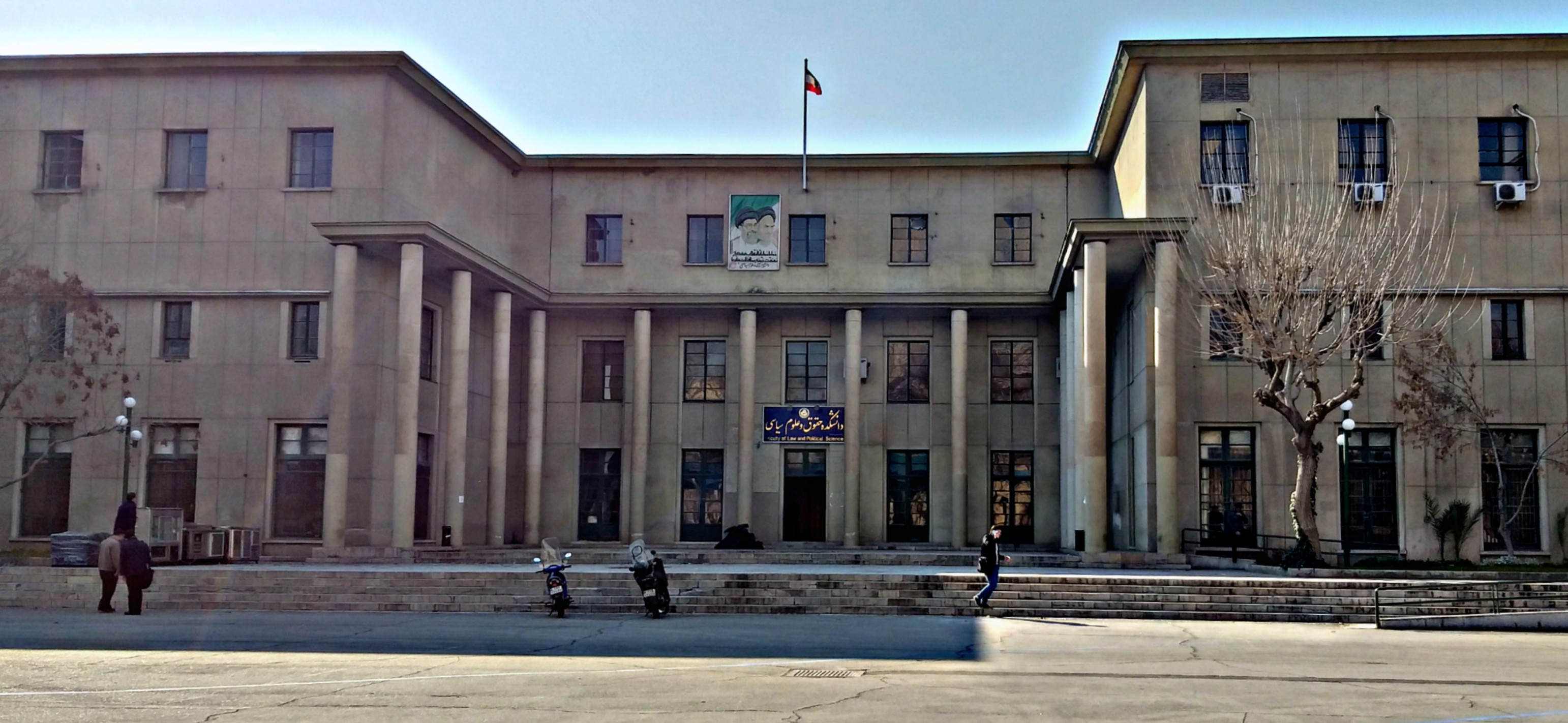
- Type: Public
- Established: 1899
- Affiliations: University of Tehran
- Chancellor: Abbas Shiri Varnamkhasti
- Location: Tehran, Iran

The Faculty of Law and Political Science at University of Tehran (Persian: دانشکده حقوق و علوم سیاسی دانشگاه تهران) is one of the oldest institutions of higher education in Iran. It was established as the College of Political Science in 1899 by the Ministry of Foreign Affairs. The faculty has trained some of the country's lawyers, judges, diplomats, and civil servants, some of whom have been influential in the political and legal life of the country. The alumni include legal scholars, political scientists, and international relations scholars who have shaped the legal, political, and foreign policy developments of modern Iran. Many students of law, political science, and international relations in Iran choose this school for their studies.Many of the nation's political elite graduated from the school.

== History ==
The School of Political Science was founded in 1899 by Hassan Pirnia. It was administered by the Ministry of Foreign Affairs. It later merged with the School of Law (Madreseh-ye āli-e hoquq), which had been established in 1918, to form the Faculty of Law and Political Science of the University of Tehran in 1933.

== People ==
=== Political ===
Many of the school's faculty and alumni later became ministers and political figures in Iran. Notable examples are:

- Ali-Akbar Dehkhoda, former Dean of the School of Political Science, literary figure and founder of the Dehkhoda Encyclopaedia
- Mohammad Ali Foroughi, former Prime Minister
- Mohammad Mosaddegh, former Prime Minister
- Ali Akbar Siassi, former Minister of Education, Minister of Foreign Affairs, Chancellor of Tehran University
- Abolqasem Najm, former Minister, diplomat and astronomer.
- Mirza Javad Khan Ameri, former Minister, MP
- Hassan Rouhani, former President of the Islamic Republic of Iran
- Hossein Amir-Abdollahian, former Minister and diplomat
- Mohammad Mehdi Esmaili, former Minister of Culture and Islamic Guidance
- Elham Aminzadeh, former vice president for legal affairs and former assistant to president in citizenship rights in the administration of President Hassan Rouhani
- Laya Joneydi, former vice president for legal affairs in the administration of President Hassan Rouhani.

== See also ==
- Higher education in Iran
- Academy of Gondishapur
- Nizamiyya
- List of universities in Iran
- Dar al-Fonun
- Tehran University of Medical Sciences, part of Tehran University until 1986.
