= Ein ad-Dowleh Mansion =

Iranian national heritage site in Tehran

Coordinates: 35°46′15″N 51°28′55″E

- عمارت عین‌الدوله
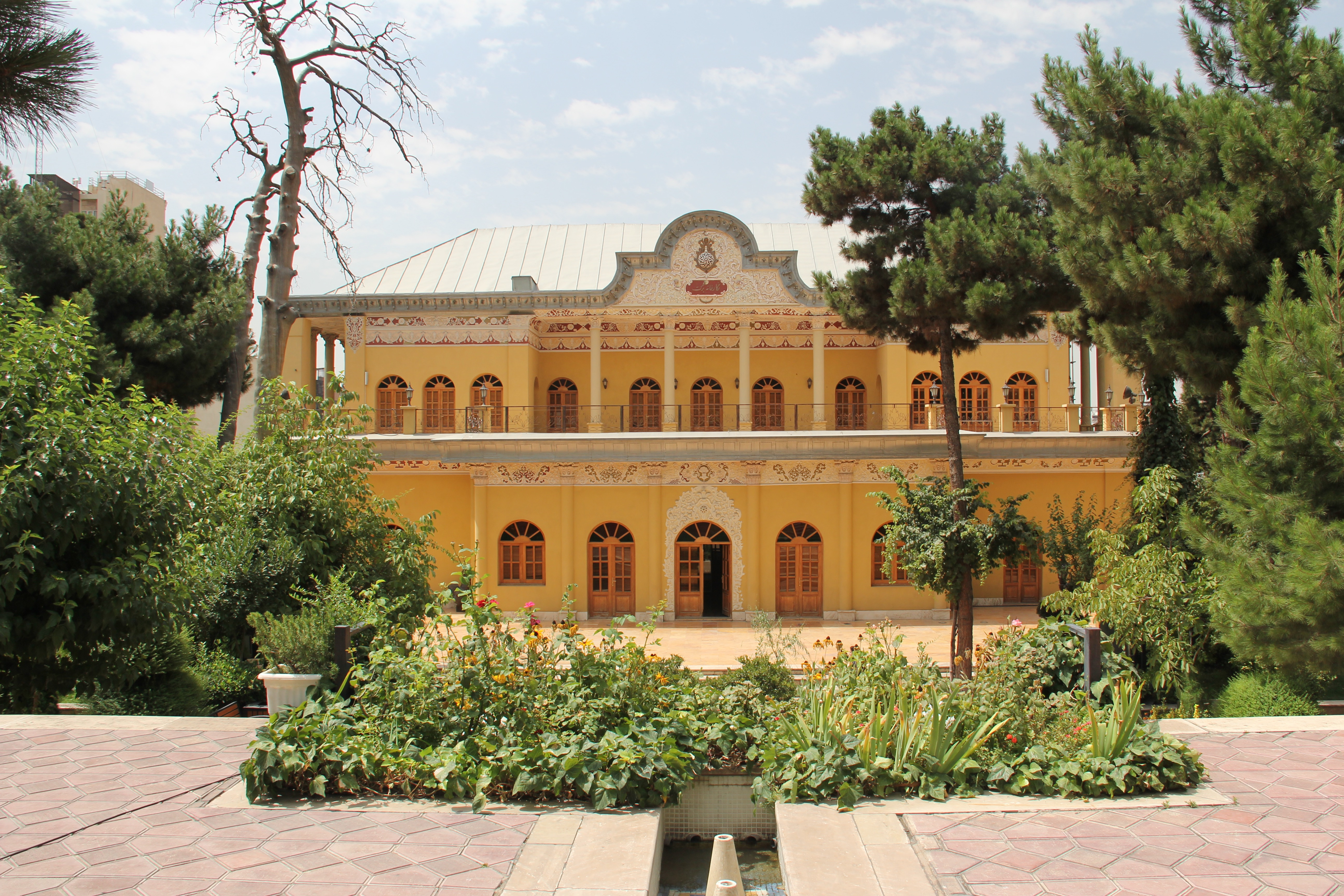

General information
- Status: Used as art gallery
- Architectural style: Qajaresque Neo-Baroque architecture
- Location: Pasdaran (district), Tehran, Iran

Ein ad-Dowleh Mansion (Persian: عمارت عین‌الدوله) is a historic mansion in Tehran, Iran. The building belonged to Prince Abdol Majid Mirza Ein ad-Dowleh, hence the name.

== History ==
The mansion was constructed between 1892 and 1912 as a summer residence for the Qajar era prime minister Abdol Majid Mirza. After the rise of the Pahlavi dynasty and due to his debts, Abdol Majid Mirza lost the mansion to Basir ad-Dowleh of the Haravi family.

The building is one of the locations used for the Tehran conference, serving as the residence of Joseph Stalin, Franklin D. Roosevelt, Winston Churchill.

It was listed among the national heritage sites of Iran with the number 2042 on 25 June 1998.

== Gallery ==
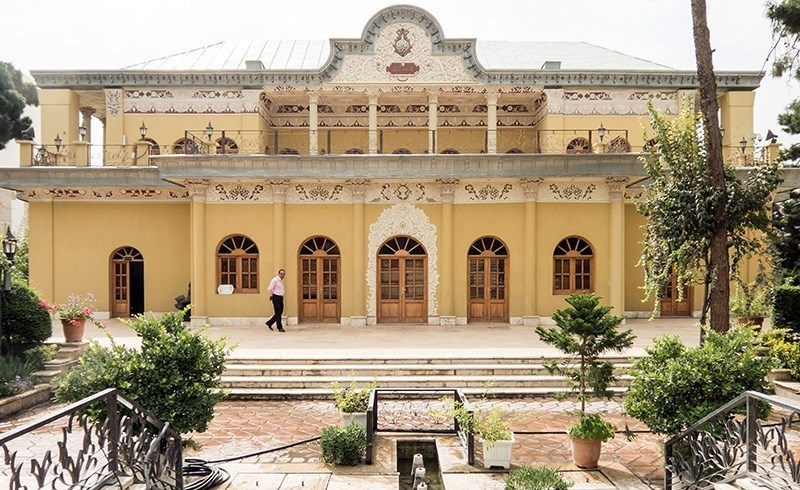

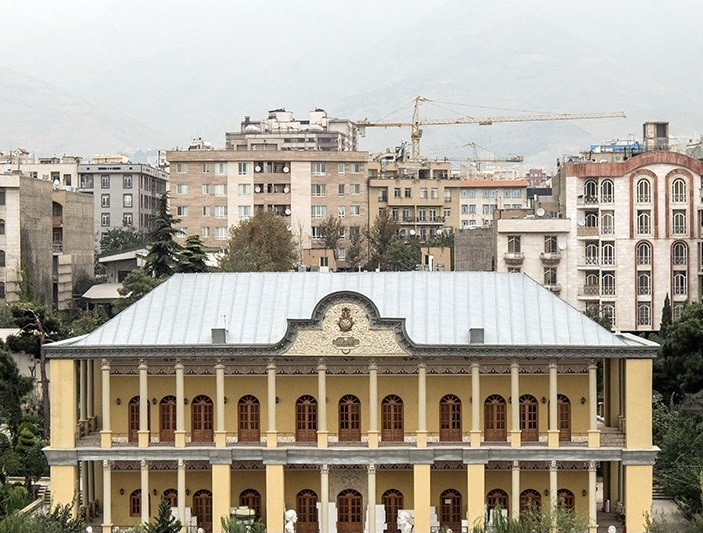

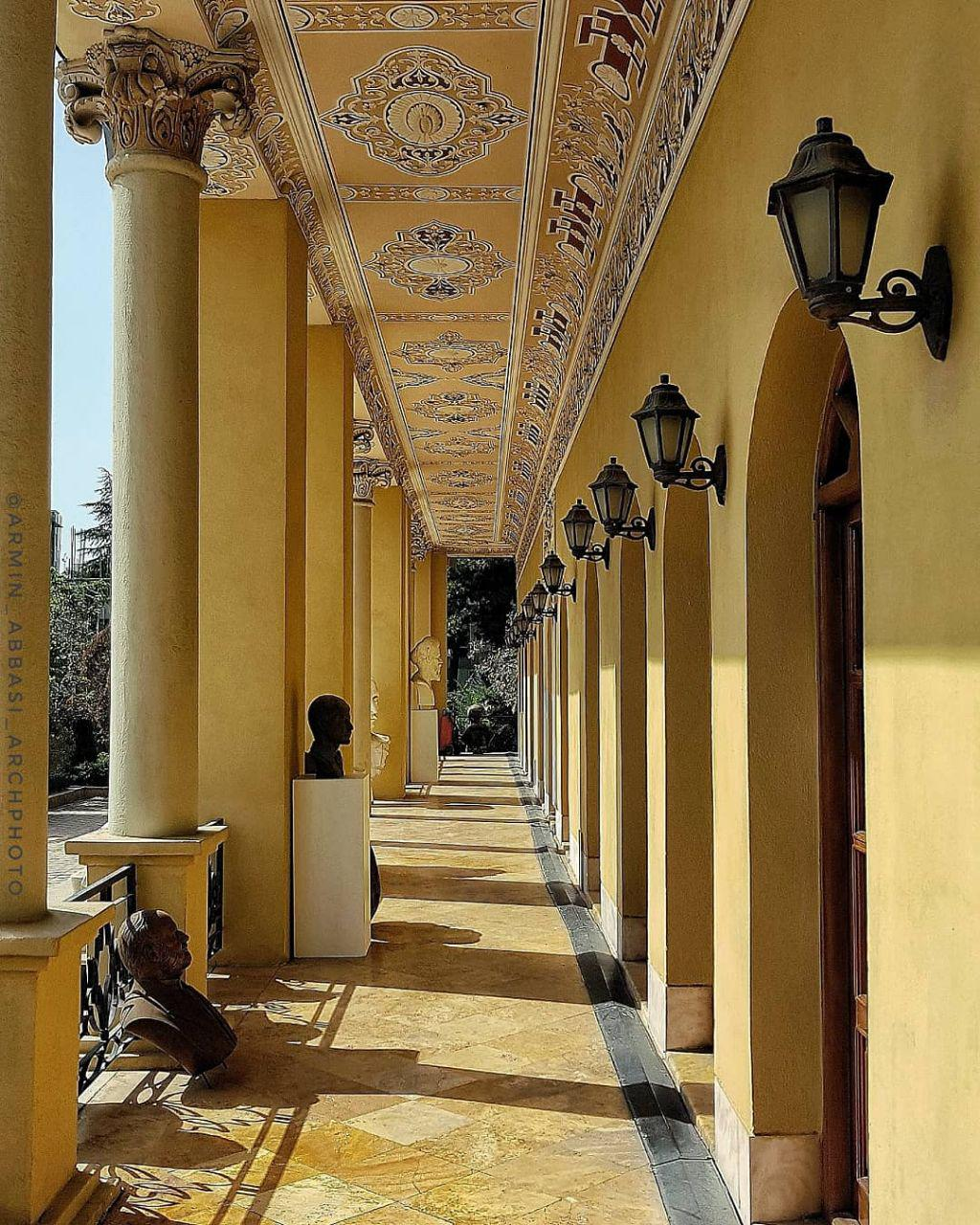

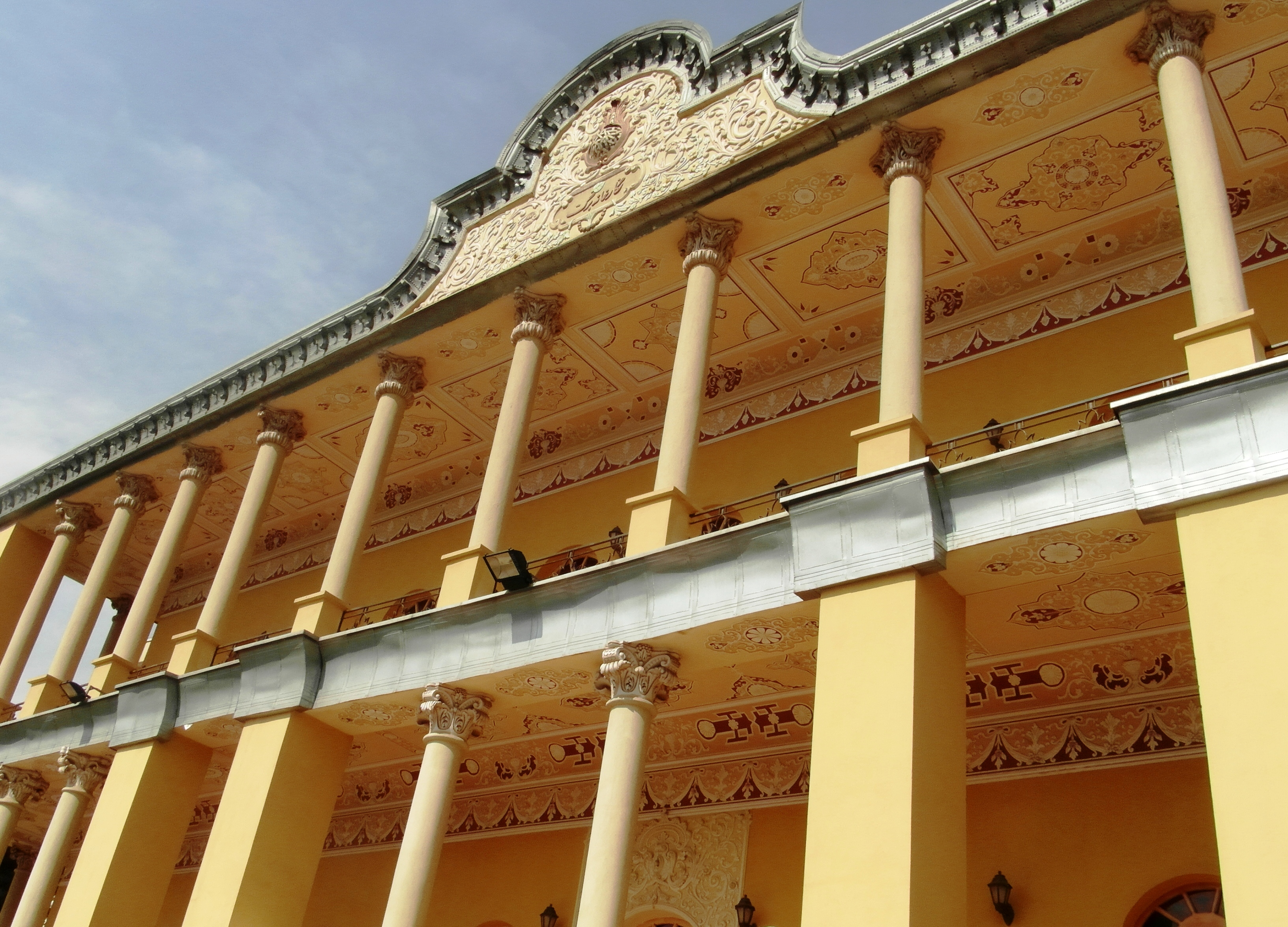
