= Esmail Momtaz od-Dowleh =

Iranian politician (1880–1933)

Mirza Esmail Momtaz od-Dowleh
- میرزا اسماعیل خان ممتازالدوله
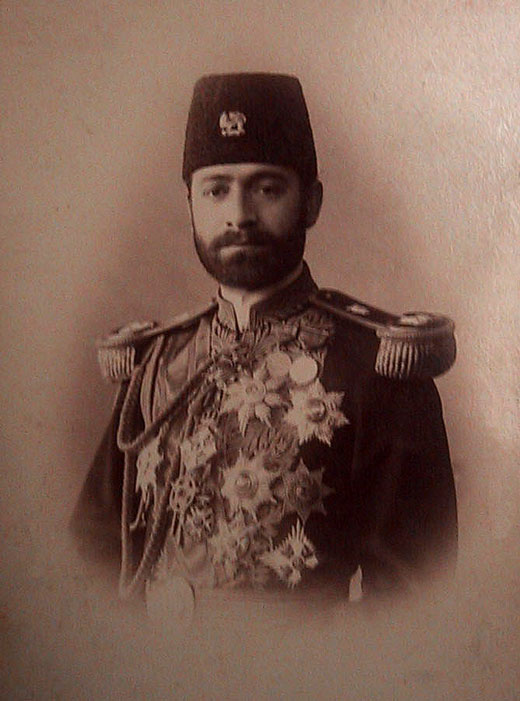
- Momtaz od-Dowleh at the age of 25

3rd Speaker of the Parliament of Iran
- In office 1908–1908/9
- Preceded by: Mahmoud Alamir
- Succeeded by: Sadegh Sadegh
- In office 1911–1912
- Preceded by: Mohammad Ali Foroughi
- Succeeded by: Hossein Pirnia

Personal details
- Born: 1880 Tehran, Sublime State of Iran
- Died: 1933 (aged 53) Tehran, Imperial State of Iran
- Party: Moderates
- Relatives: Samad Khan Momtaz os-Saltaneh (brother)
- Occupation: Minister of Culture; Minister of Finance; Minister of Education; Minister of Justice
- Other name: Esmail Momtaz
- Writing career
- Notable work: Persian Constitution of 1906

Esmail Momtaz od-Dowleh (Persian: اسماعیل ممتازالدوله; 1880 – 1933) was a notable Iranian statesman of the early 20th century. Born in Tehran in 1880, he was one of the original Parliamentarians of the First Majles in 1906. He was also its fourth Speaker.

When the Parliament was bombarded by Mohammad Ali Shah Qajar, he was the speaker of majlis and escaped to Paris. In London, he was interviewed about the crisis which was then printed in European newspapers.

Momtaz od-Dowleh was also Minister of Culture, Minister of Finance, Minister of Education and Minister of Justice. He was the actual writer of the Persian Constitution of 1906, being fluent in French and able to copy extracts lifted from the Belgian constitution. Momtaz died of coronary heart disease at the age of 54 in 1933.

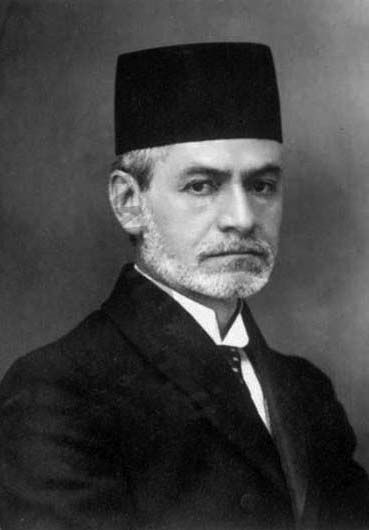
Momtaz od-Dowleh, 1930
