= Mohammad Ali Foroughi =

Iranian diplomat and politician (1877–1942)

Zoka-ol-Molk (Persian: ذُکاءُالمُلک) Mohammad-Ali Foroughi
- محمدعلی فروغی
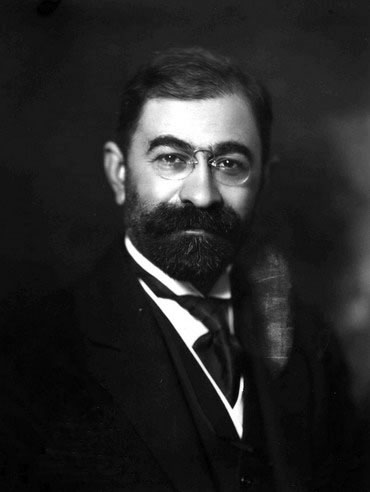
- Foroughi in 1920s

18th Prime Minister of Iran
- In office 27 August 1941 – 9 March 1942
- Monarchs: Reza Shah; Mohammad Reza Pahlavi
- Preceded by: Ali Mansur
- Succeeded by: Ali Soheili
- In office 18 September 1933 – 3 December 1935
- Monarch: Reza Shah
- Preceded by: Mehdi Qoli Hedayat
- Succeeded by: Mahmoud Djam
- In office 1 November 1925 – 13 June 1926; Acting
- Monarch: Reza Shah
- Preceded by: Reza Shah
- Succeeded by: Hassan Mostowfi

Minister of Finance
- In office 1 September 1924 – 1 November 1925
- Prime Minister: Reza Shah
- Preceded by: Mahmoud Djam
- In office 15 June 1923 – 26 October 1923
- Prime Minister: Hassan Pirnia
- Preceded by: Ali-Reza Gharagozlou
- Succeeded by: Mahmoud Djam
- In office 14 March 1915 – 1 May 1915
- Prime Minister: Hassan Pirnia
- In office 24 May 1913 – 3 June 1913
- Prime Minister: Saad al-Dowleh

Minister of Foreign Affairs
- In office 28 October 1923 – 1 September 1924
- Prime Minister: Reza Shah
- Preceded by: Mohammad Mossadegh
- Succeeded by: Hassan Moshar
- In office 14 February 1923 – 15 June 1923
- Prime Minister: Hassan Mostowfi
- Succeeded by: Mohammad Mossadegh

Minister of Justice
- In office 3 June 1913 – 6 December 1914
- Prime Minister: Saad al-Dowleh; Hassan Mostowfi

Speaker of the Parliament
- In office 6 July 1912 – 10 July 1912
- Preceded by: Mirza Esmaiel Khan
- Succeeded by: Hossein Pirnia

Member of the Parliament of Iran
- In office 19 November 1909 – 3 August 1921
- Constituency: Tehran

Personal details
- Born: Early August 1877 Tehran, Sublime State of Iran
- Died: 26 November 1942 or 27 November 1942 (aged 65) Tehran, Imperial State of Iran
- Resting place: Ibn Babawayh Cemetery
- Party: Revival Party
- Children: 6 including Mohsen Foroughi
- Education: Tehran School of Political Sciences; Dar ul-Funun

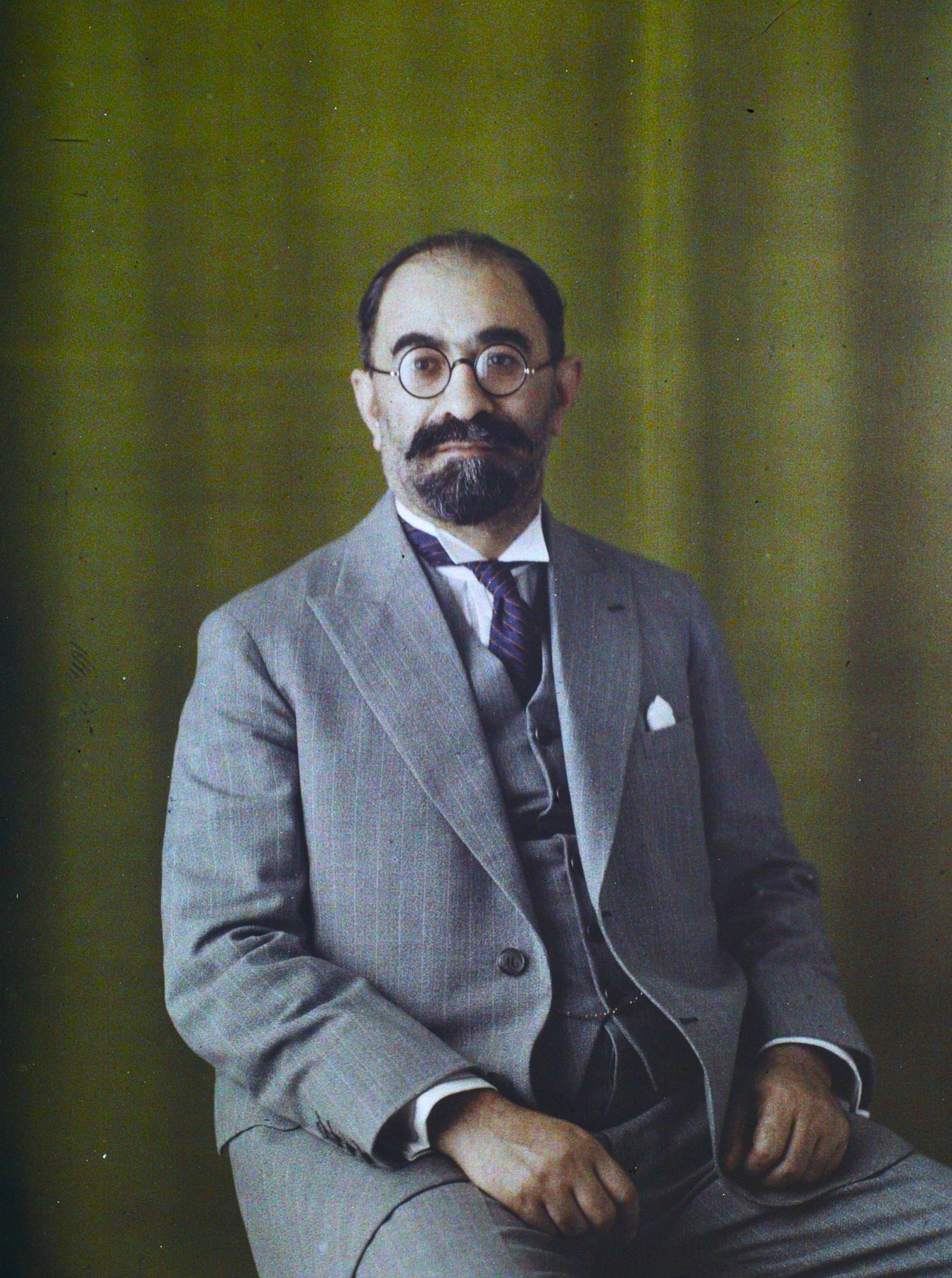
Autochrome portrait by Georges Chevalier, 1928

Mohammad Ali Foroughi (Persian: محمدعلی فروغی; early August 1877 – 26 or 27 November 1942), also known as Zoka-ol-Molk (Persian: ذُکاءُالمُلک), was an Iranian politician, writer, freemason, Azali, and diplomat who served as the Prime Minister of Iran for three terms, being the first Prime Minister under Mohammad Reza Pahlavi. He wrote numerous books on ancient Iranian history and is known for founding the Academy of Iran.

== Early life and education ==
Foroughi was born in Tehran to a merchant family from Isfahan. His ancestor, Mirza Abutorab, was the representative of Isfahan in Mugan plain at Nader Shah's coronation. His grandfather, Mohammad Mehdi Arbab Isfahani, was amongst the most influential merchants of Isfahan and was skilled in history and geography. His father Mohammad Hosein Foroughi was the translator of the Shah to Arabic and French. He was also a poet and published a newspaper called Tarbiat. Naser al-Din Shah Qajar nicknamed Mohammad Hosein, Foroughi, after hearing a poem that he had written. During his early life, Foroughi studied at the élite Dar ul-Funun (Polytechnic school) in Tehran.

== Career ==
In 1907, Foroughi's father died and Foroughi inherited his father's title of Zoka-ol-Molk. During the same year, Foroughi became the dean of Tehran School of Political Science. In 1909, he entered politics as a member of Majlis (Parliament), representing Tehran. He subsequently became speaker of the house and later minister in several cabinets as well as prime minister three times and once as the acting Prime Minister when Reza Khan resigned as prime minister to take up the crown as Reza Shah. In 1912, he became the president of the Iranian Supreme Court. Later he was appointed prime minister and dismissed in 1935 due to the father of his son-in-law's, Mohammad Vali Asadi, alleged participation in the riot in Mashhad against the reforms implemented by Reza Shah.

However, later Foroughi regained his status and became Prime Minister during the initial phase of Mohammad Reza Pahlavi's reign. Foroughi as a prime minister was instrumental in having Mohammad Reza Pahlavi proclaimed as shah after his father, Reza Shah, was forced to abdicate (16 September 1941) and exiled by the allied forces of the United Kingdom and the Soviet Union following the Anglo-Soviet invasion of Iran during World War II. After the collapse of his cabinet, he was named Minister of Court and then named ambassador of Iran to the United States, but he died in Tehran at the age of 67 before he could assume the post.

Foroughi founded the National Artifacts Association in Iran. Through this association, he was involved in the reconstruction of the poet Ferdowsi's tomb.

== Contribution ==
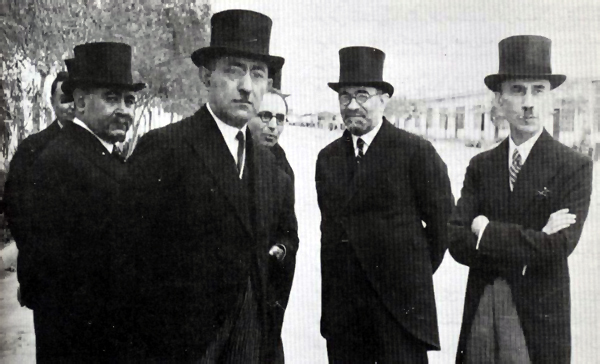
Foroughi with Ali Mansur, Mostafa Gholibayat, Aliakbar Davar and Mahmoud Jam.

The most important contribution of Foroughi to philosophy is his triplet, "The Evolution of Philosophy in Europe", in which he covered the works of European Philosophers, starting from the Seven Sages of Greece in the 7th century BC through to Henri Bergson, in the 20th century.

== Books ==
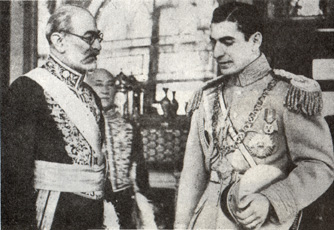
Foroughi with Mohammad Reza Shah Pahlavi.

Foroughi wrote numerous books, including The History of Iran, The History of the Ancient Peoples of The East, A Short History of Ancient Rome, Constitutional Etiquette, A Concise Course in Physics, Far-fetched Thoughts, The Philosophy of Socrates, The Evolution of Philosophy in Europe, My Message to the Academy of Language (Farhangestan), The Rules of Oratory or The Technique of Speech Making, and a book on the Shahnameh (The Book of Kings).

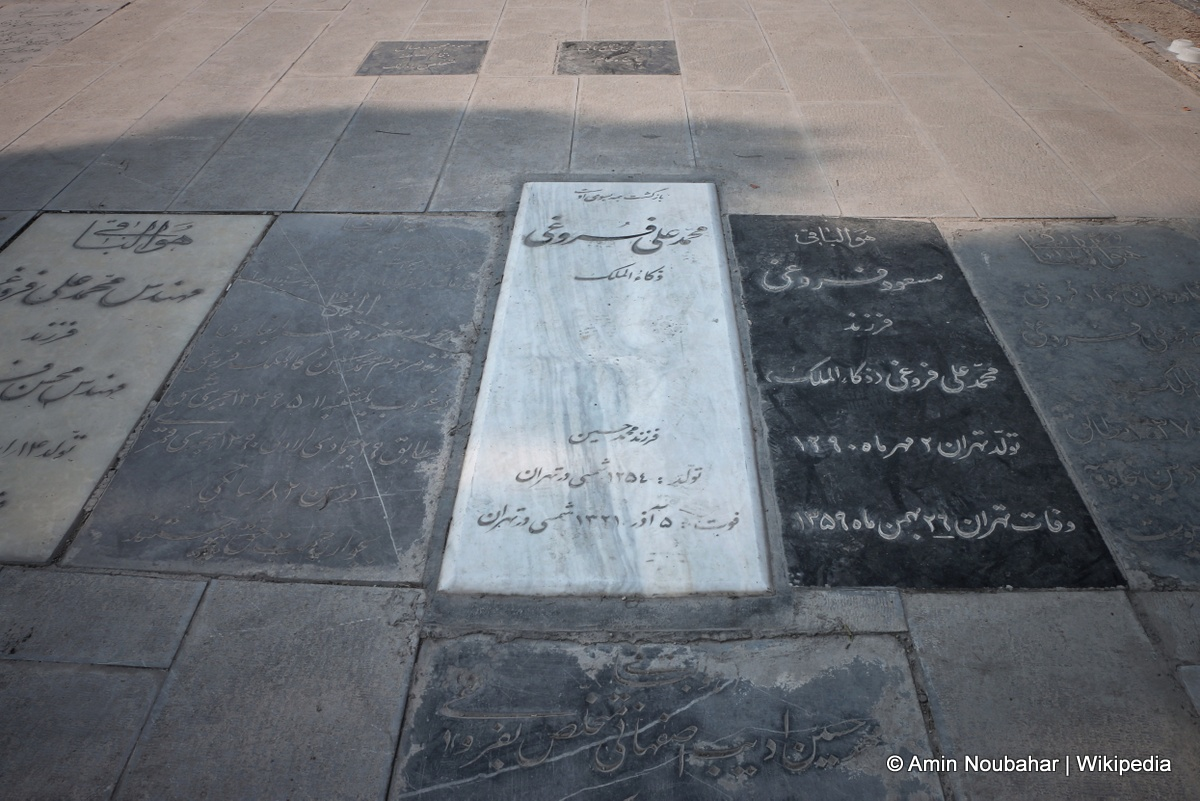
Grave of Mohammad Ali Foroughi in Ibn Babawayh Cemetery

In addition to this, Foroughi prepared scholarly editions of the works of Saadi, Hafez, Rumi, Omar Khayyam and Ferdowsi. The best-known of Foroughi's critical editions is Saadi's Kolliyat. His son, Mohsen Foroughi, was a renowned architect who completed his studies in France and designed the Niavaran Palace inside Niavaran Complex in northern Tehran, Iran. The palace, completed in 1968, was the primary residence of the last Shah, Mohammad Reza Pahlavi and the Imperial family until the 1979 Iranian Revolution. Franz Malekebrahimian worked directly under Mohsen Foruoghi in implementation and maintenance of the Palace.

== See also ==
- Pahlavi dynasty
- List of prime ministers of Iran
- Abdolhossein Teymourtash
- Ali-Akbar Davar
- Hassan Taqizadeh

== Sources ==
- 'Alí Rizā Awsatí (عليرضا اوسطى), Iran in the past three centuries (Irān dar Se Qarn-e Goz̲ashteh – ايران در سه قرن گذشته), Volumes 1 and 2 (Paktāb Publishing – انتشارات پاکتاب, Tehran, Iran, 2003). ISBN 964-93406-6-1 (Vol. 1), ISBN 964-93406-5-3 (Vol. 2).

Political offices
Preceded by Reza Khan	Prime Minister of Iran; 1925–1926	Succeeded by Mostowfi ol-Mamalek
Preceded by Mehdi Qoli Hedayat	Prime Minister of Iran; 1933–1935	Succeeded by Mahmoud Jam
Preceded by Ali Mansur	Prime Minister of Iran; 1941–1942	Succeeded by Ali Soheili
