= Abdol Majid Mirza =

Qajar prince and twice Prime Minister of Iran (1845–1927)

Abdol Majid Mirza Eyn od-Dowleh
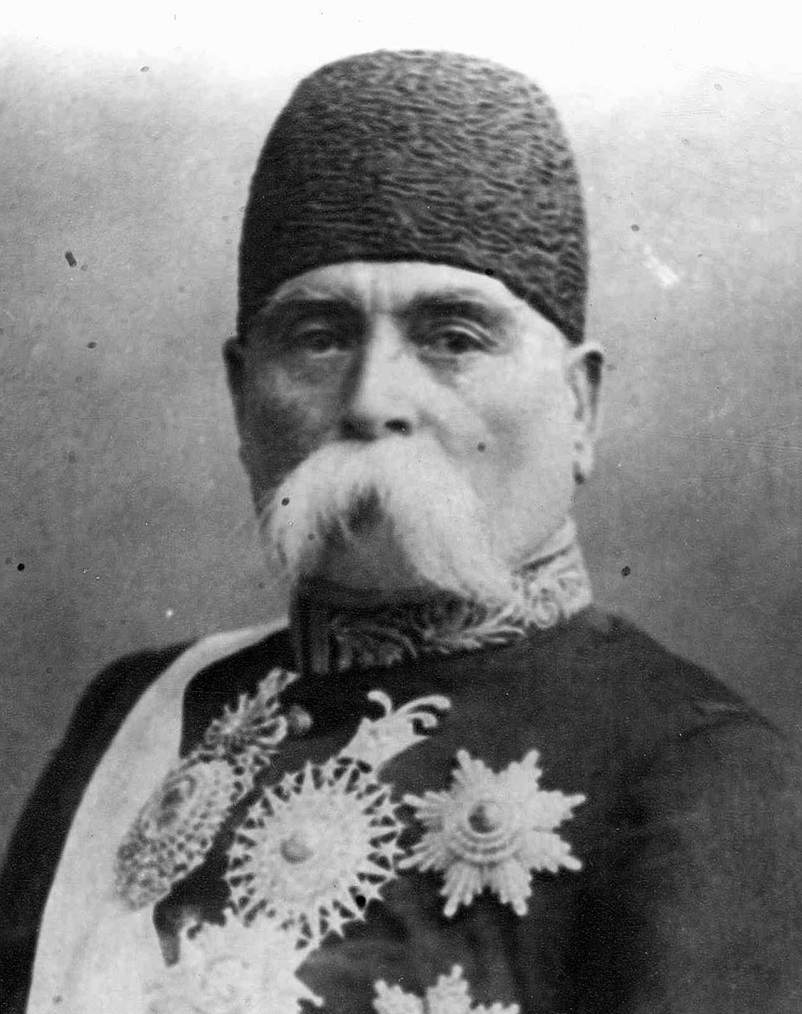

10th Prime Minister of Iran
- In office 1 May 1915 – 18 August 1915
- Monarch: Ahmad Shah Qajar
- Preceded by: Hassan Pirnia
- Succeeded by: Mostowfi ol-Mamalek
- In office 28 December 1917 – 20 May 1918
- Monarch: Ahmad Shah Qajar
- Preceded by: Mohammad Ali Ala al-Saltaneh
- Succeeded by: Mostowfi ol-Mamalek

Premier of Iran
- In office 24 January 1904 – 5 August 1906
- Preceded by: Amir Asghar Khan
- Succeeded by: Mirza Nasrullah Khan

Personal details
- Born: 1845 Tehran, Sublime State of Iran
- Died: 2 November 1927 (aged 81–82) Tehran, Imperial State of Iran
- Party: Independent
- Parent: Soltan-Ahmad Mirza Azod od-Dowleh (father)

Abdol Majid Mirza (Persian: عبدالمجیدمیرزا; 1845 – 2 November 1927), commonly referred to by his title Eyn od-Dowleh (Persian: عین‌الدوله), was one of the major leaders of the Minor Tyranny. He led the royalist forces against the constitutionalists in the Siege of Tabriz (1908–1909), during which he deliberately inflicted a famine that led to the deaths of an estimated 100,000 civilians. A Qajar prince, Eyn-ed-Dowleh served as the 20th and last grand vizier of Iran from 1904 till 1906 and then as the 10th prime minister of Iran in 1915 and from 1917 till 1918.

Eyn-ed-Dowleh was a staunch conservative and a supporter of absolute monarchy. He was furthermore anti-clerical, anti-liberal and an opposer of Persian Constitutionalism.

== Early life ==
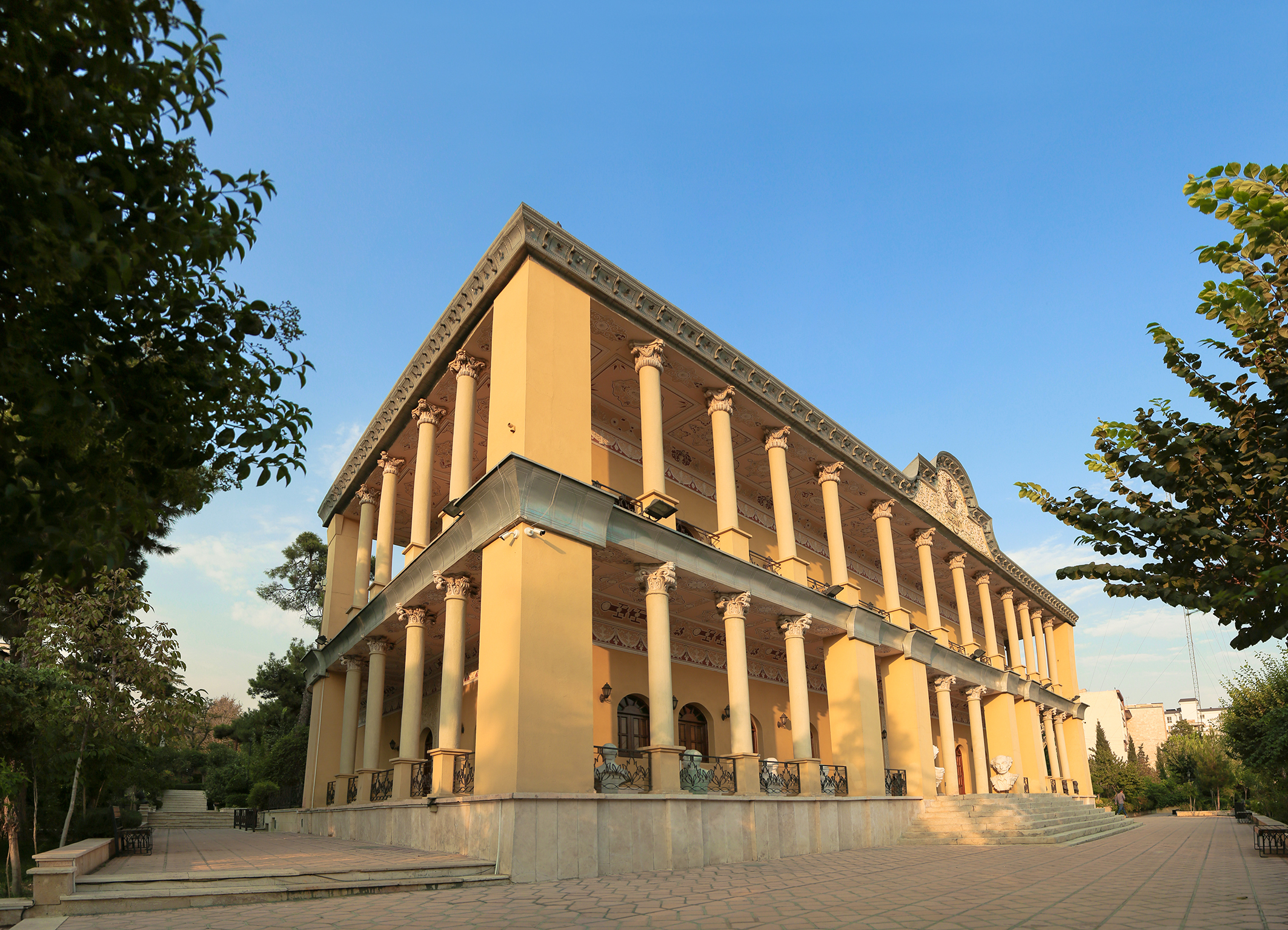
Ein ad-Dowleh Mansion in Tehran

Abd-Al Majid Mirza Eyn-ed-Dowleh was born in 1845 in Tehran to Prince Soltan-Ahmad Mirza Azod od-Dowleh, the 49th son of Fath-Ali Shah Qajar(r. 1797–1834). He was of partial Georgian descent through his paternal grandmother, Taj ol-Dowleh.

== Premier of Iran (1904–1906) ==
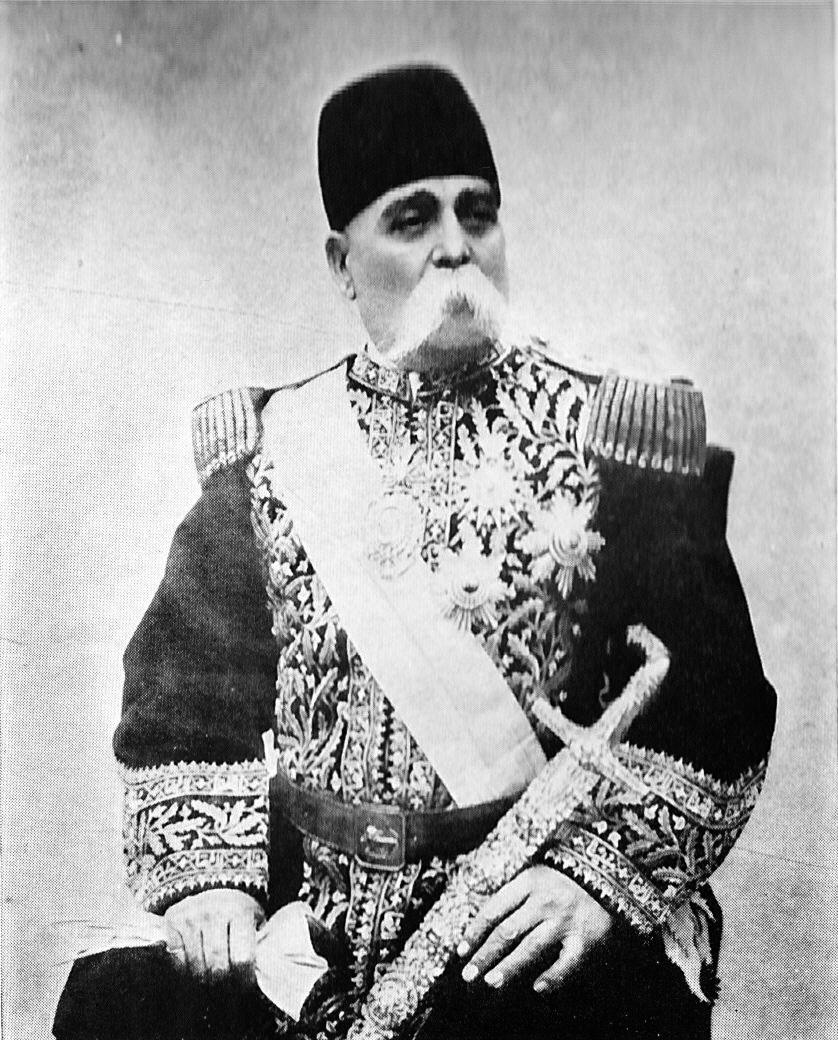
Eyn-ed-Dowleh as Premier

Eyn-ed-Dowleh's time as Premier of Iran (1904–1906) unfolded during one of the most delicate phases of Qajar rule, when the monarchy faced mounting internal pressures and external financial constraints. Appointed wazir-e a'zam in January 1904 and confirmed as full premier by September, he stepped into the role after having already served as minister of the interior from 1903. His appointment reflected a deliberate choice by Mozaffar ad-Din Shah Qajar for a figure known for administrative firmness and long experience in provincial governance.

The country was burdened by heavy debts to the Russian Empire, currency depreciation, and the economic ripple effects of the Russo-Japanese War. Eyn-ed-Dowleh responded with a series of practical measures: he enforced stricter budgetary discipline at court, continued the customs reforms introduced by the Belgian advisor Joseph Naus (which had demonstrably increased revenue in previous years), and introduced additional levies on certain urban trades.

He maintained close coordination with Russian representatives, seeing their support as a necessary counterweight to British influence and a means of preserving central authority amid growing provincial unrest. In Tehran, under his direction, the governor Ala al-Dowleh applied rigorous enforcement against market irregularities, including public punishments for alleged profiteering, to stabilize prices and supply chains during a time of scarcity.

During his time as premier, the Constitutional Revolution gradually intensified, driven by a combination of economic grievances, resentment toward foreign advisors, and broader calls for institutional change. Demonstrations in 1905 led to a significant bast at Shah Abdol-Azim Shrine, where large numbers of merchants and ulama demanded reforms, including the removal of certain officials and the creation of a house of justice.

Eyn-ed-Dowleh accompanied the shah on his European journey that summer, leaving day-to-day management to the crown prince, whose handling of Tehran affairs added further.

== Tehran Mosque Massacre of 1906 ==
On 11 July 1906, Eyn ed-Dowleh ordered the arrest of the revered preacher Seyyed Mohammad Waez. As royal guards dragged the scholar through the streets, a massive, spontaneous crowd of theology students (tollab), bazaar merchants, and ordinary Muslim citizens swarmed the central government barracks to block his imprisonment. Refusing to negotiate, Eyn ed-Dowleh ordered the military to clear the streets by force. In the ensuing chaos, infantrymen fired a direct volley into the dense, unarmed crowd. A single bullet struck and instantly killed Sayyid Hosein, a young seminary student.

Because Sayyid Hosein was a Sayyid, a direct descendant of the Prophet Muhammad, his killing by state forces was viewed by the pious populace not merely as murder, but as an act of sacrilege. The enraged crowd dipped a white banner directly into the young man's blood, hoisting it as a revolutionary standard. They carried his corpse through the city, shouting religious lamentations that explicitly compared Eyn ed-Dowleh to Yazid I, arguably the most hated tyrant in Islamic history.

The following morning, on 12 July 1906, the crisis escalated into a full-scale massacre. A monumental funeral procession consisting of thousands of mourning citizens, flanked by senior Grand Mujtahids Mirza Sayyed Mohammad Tabatabai and Seyyed Abdollah Behbahani marched toward the Grand Bazaar. Viewing this religious mourning as an act of overt treason against the crown, Eyn ed-Dowleh deployed heavy infantry units to the nearby mosque.

Soldiers formed blockades across the central avenues and, under explicit royal court mandates, opened fire with repeated, coordinated volleys directly into the thick of the funeral march. The high-caliber gunfire ripped through the dense crowd, triggering a catastrophic stampede. Between 14 and 29 additional protesters were gunned down.

This second wave of state-sponsored violence completely broke the Qajar regime's authority. By executing religious students and firing upon the top Islamic scholars of the realm, Eyn ed-Dowleh permanently alienated the population. Within days, over 1,000 terrified but defiant clerics abandoned the capital entirely for the holy sanctuary of Qom, while thousands of citizens launched a massive economic shutdown in Tehran. The massacre backfired completely, forcing the dying Mozaffar ad-Din Shah to permanently fire Eyn ed-Dowleh just weeks later and capitulate to the creation of Iran's first parliament.

== Governor of Azerbaijan (1908–1909) and Tabriz Famine of 1909 ==
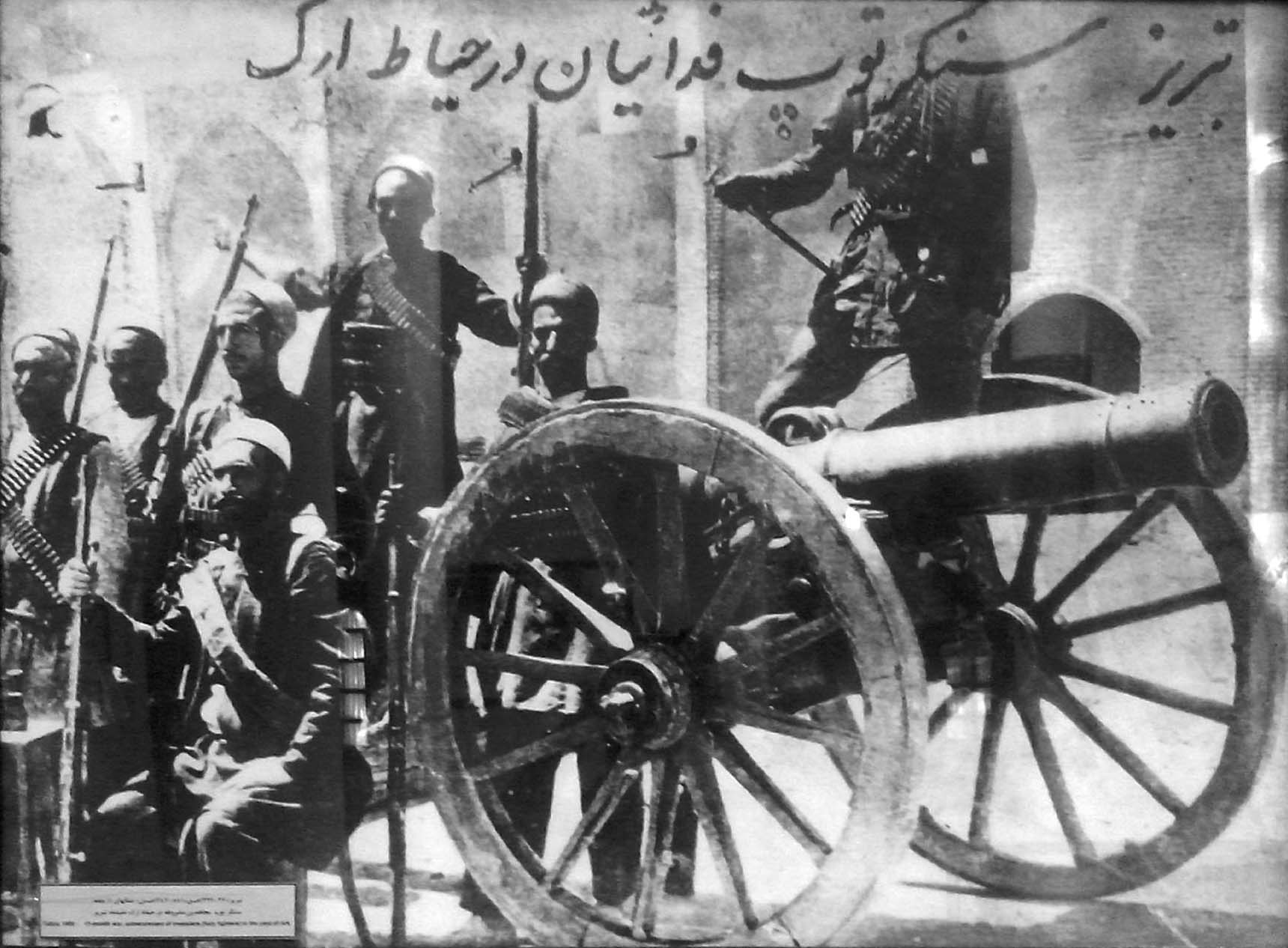
The constitutional forces during the Siege of Tabriz

Eyn-ed-Dowleh was sent to Azerbaijan (Iran) as governor to quell the Siege of Tabriz (1908–1909), which was started by Sattar Khan and Baqir Khan.

With the arrival of a new detachment of 400 Cossacks, six cannons, and regular tribal cavalry, the camp of Eyn-ed-Dowleh regained vitality. On 16 January 1909, his forces encircled the city. Although their assault was unsuccessful, they managed to impose a siege. Thus, a new and more intense phase of the conflict began.

On 4 February 1909, Eyn-ed-Dowleh completed the siege, and all entry and exit points of the city fell into the hands of the royalist forces. Despite the efforts of the constitutionalists to ration essential goods, including bread, and repeated attempts to break the siege during February and March, the scarcity of supplies worsened and trade collapsed. The food shortage became so dire that people began eating grass due to hunger. Consequently, a significant number of people died of starvation and the population of Tabriz shrank from 240,000 to less than 100,000 in the course of a year.

The residents of Tabriz were exhausted from the siege, which brought them suffering without delivering the promised results. Groups of impoverished women publicly cursed Sattar Khan and Baqir Khan, instead of blaming the famine on Eyn-ed-Dowleh.

The constitutionalists, however, declared that they would not surrender. In order to end the resistance, they put forward a set of demands which included the establishment of a constitutional regime in the country, a general amnesty, the lifting of the royalist’s siege on the city, and the appointment of a new governor to Azerbaijan. Eyn-ed-dowleh resigned shortly thereafter.

Political offices
Preceded by Amir Asghar Khan	Premier of Iran; 1904–1906	Succeeded by Mirza Nasrullah Khan
Preceded by Hassan Pirnia	Prime Minister of Iran; 1915	Succeeded by Mostowfi ol-Mamalek
Preceded by Mohammad Ali Ala al-Saltaneh	Prime Minister of Iran; 1917–1918	Succeeded by Mostowfi ol-Mamalek
