= Bahlgerd =

Bahlgerd بهلگرد
- Village
- Location within Iran
- Coordinates: 32°46′28″N 59°22′56″E
- Country: Iran
- Province: South Khorasan
- County: Birjand
- Bakhsh: Central
- Rural District: Baqeran

Population (2006)
  - Total: 203
- Time zone: UTC+3:30 (IRST)
  - Summer (DST): UTC+4:30 (IRDT)

Bahlgerd (Persian: بهلگرد, also Romanized as Behalgird, Bālgerd, and Beḩalgerd; also known as Bāgh-e Bahlgerd) is a village in Baqeran Rural District, in the Central District of Birjand County, South Khorasan Province, Iran. At the 2006 census, its population was 203, in 64 families.
