= Hossein Pirnia =

Iranian politician (1875–1948)

Hossein Pirnia Mo'tamen ol-Molk
- حسین پیرنیا
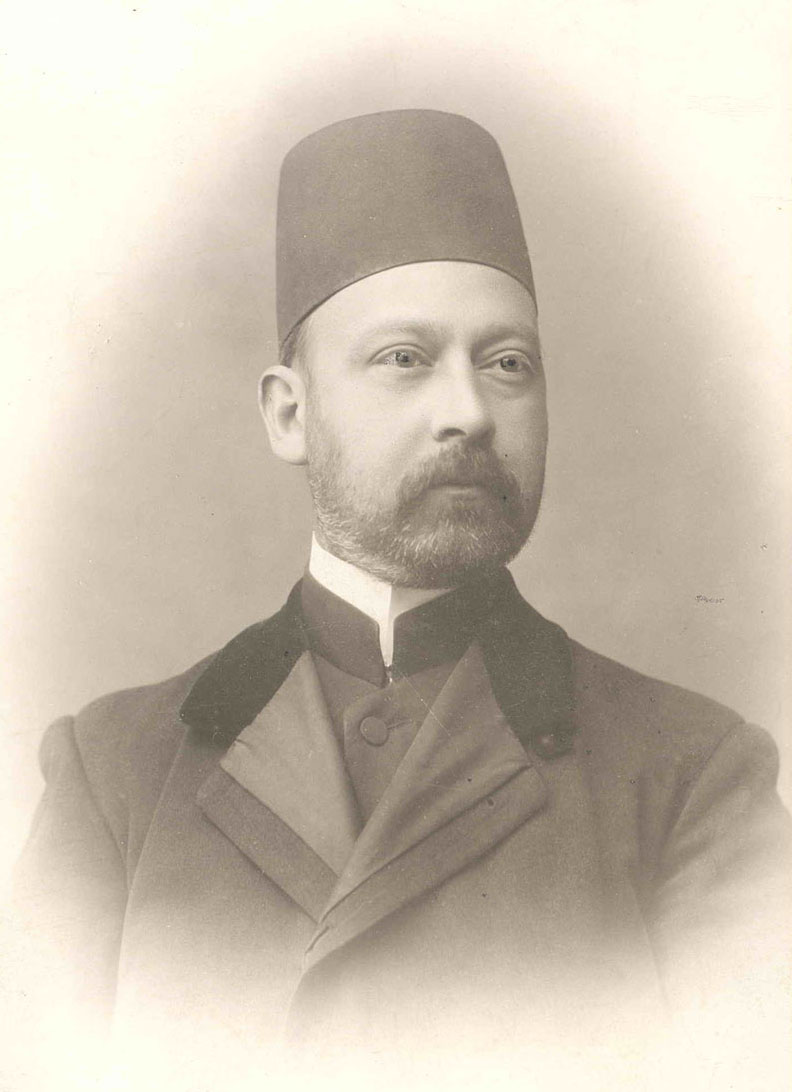
- Hossein Pirnia, 1910s

6th Speaker of the Parliament of Iran
- In office 1914–1925
- Preceded by: Mirza Esmail Khan
- Succeeded by: Mostowfi ol-Mamalek
- In office 1928–1929
- Preceded by: Mohammad Tadayyon
- Succeeded by: Hossein Dadgar

Personal details
- Born: 1875
- Died: 1948 (aged 72–73)
- Party: Moderates (1912-1915); Independent (1921-1928)
- Parent: Mirza Nasrullah Khan (father)
- Relatives: Hassan Pirnia (brother)

Hossein Pirnia (Persian: حسین پیرنیا; 1875–1948), also known as Mo'tamen ol-Molk (Persian: مؤتمن‌الملک), was an Iranian politician. His father, Mirza Nasrullah Khan, and his elder brother, Hassan Pirnia, both served as Prime Minister of Iran.

== Career ==
He served as speaker of the Parliament of Iran from 1914 to 1925, and again from 1928 to 1929.

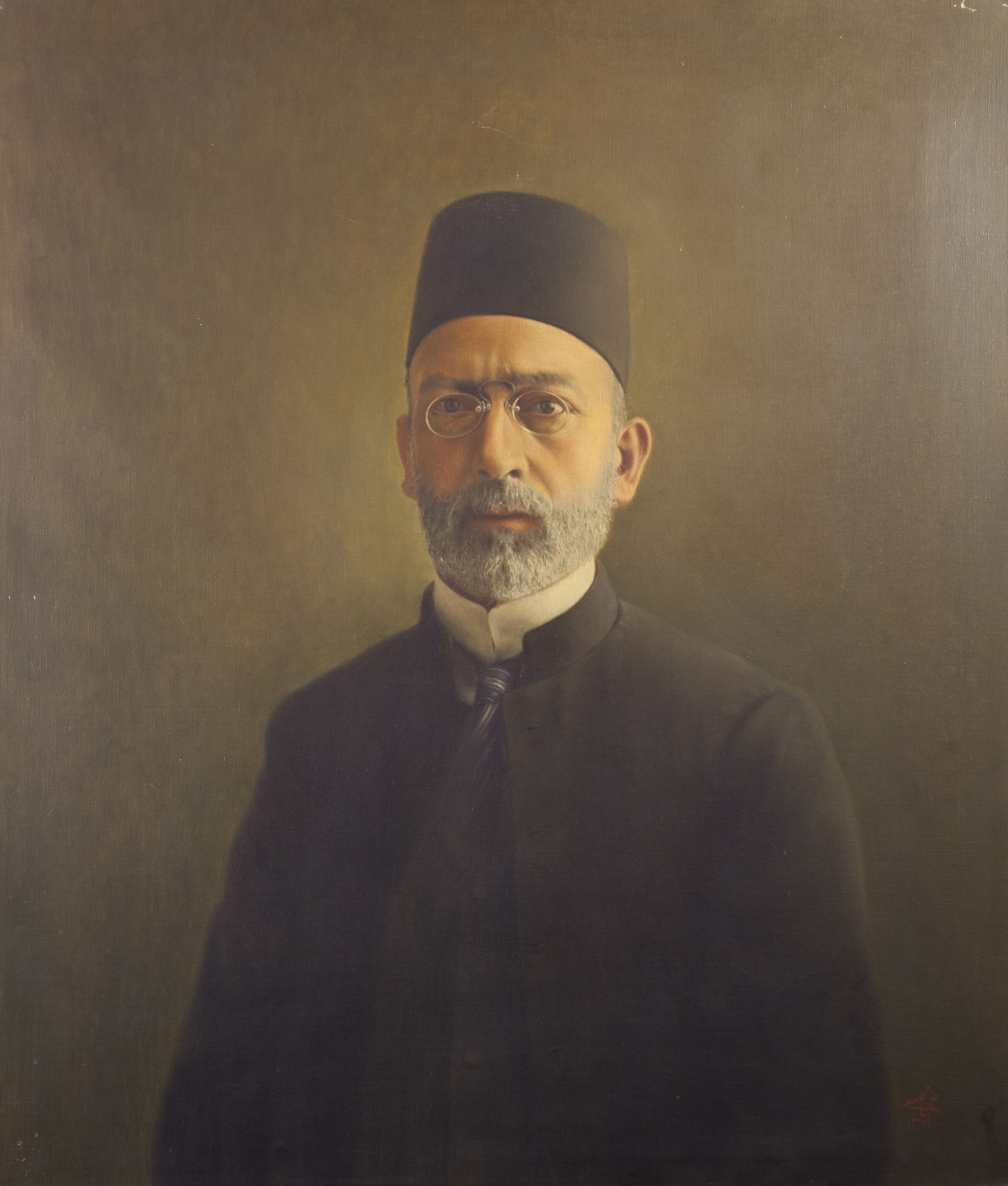
Portrait of Pirnia by Ali Mahmudi, 1932/33

Pirnia played a significant role in the drafting of the Persian Constitution of 1906 and served as Minister of Education in 1918 and Minister without portfolio in 1920. He was elected to every session of the Parliament (Majlis) from 1906, serving as speaker for more than eleven years in total. In 1943, he was elected from Tehran to the 14th session of Parliament but declined to serve.

== Sources ==
- Ghani, Cyrus. Iran and the Rise of Reza Shah: From Qajar Collapse to Pahlavi Power. I.B. Tauris: London, 2000. ISBN 1-86064-629-8
- Azimi, Fakhreddin. The Quest for Democracy in Iran. Harvard University Press: 2010. ISBN 0674057066
