= Mohammad-Ali Ala ol-Saltaneh =

8th Prime Minister of Iran (1829–1918)

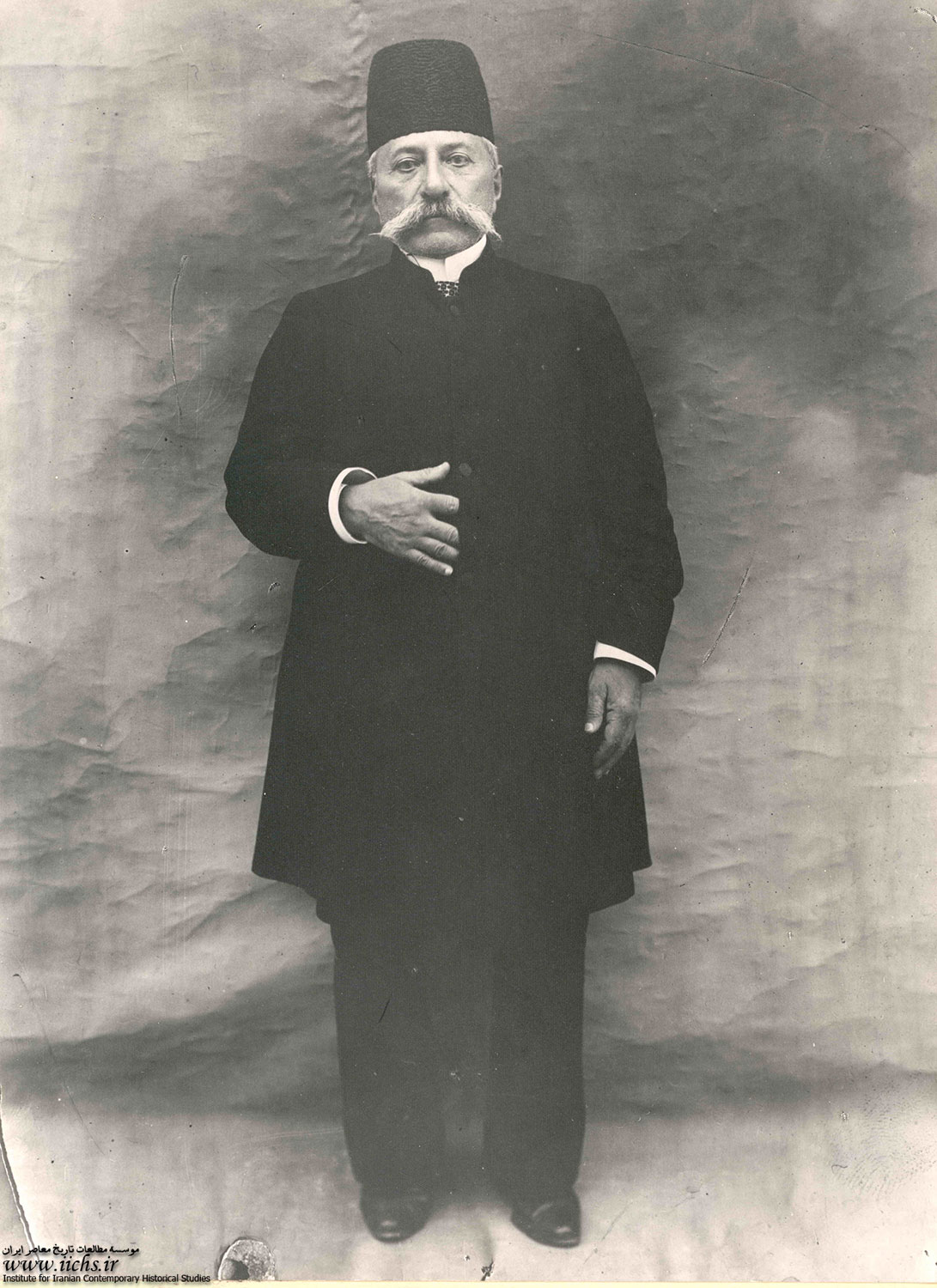
- Mohammad-Ali Ala ol-Saltaneh

8th Prime Minister of Iran
- In office 18 January 1913 – 16 August 1913
- Monarch: Ahmad Shah Qajar
- Preceded by: Najaf-Qoli Samsam al-Saltaneh
- Succeeded by: Mostowfi ol-Mamalek
- In office 5 June 1917 – 21 November 1917
- Monarch: Ahmad Shah Qajar
- Preceded by: Hassan Vosugh al-Dowleh
- Succeeded by: Abdol Majid Mirza

Personal details
- Born: 1829; Baghdad, Ottoman Empire (present-day Iraq)
- Died: 23 June 1918 (aged 88–89); Tehran, Qajar Iran
- Political party: Independent

Mohammad-Ali Ala ol-Saltaneh (Persian: محمدعلی علاءالسلطنه; 1829 – 23 June 1918 in Tehran), was an Iranian Prime Minister of the late Qajar era. He served as Prime Minister of Iran twice.

Political offices
| Preceded by Najaf-Qoli Khan Bakhtiari | Prime Minister of Iran; 1913 | Succeeded by Mostowfi ol-Mamalek |
| Preceded by Vossug ed Dowleh | Prime Minister of Iran; 1917 | Succeeded by Abdol Majid Mirza |
