= Cyrus Ghani =

Iranian-born American academic and lawyer

- Born: 8 November 1929; Sabzevar, Khorasan, Iran
- Died: 2015 (aged 85–86); New York, U.S.
- Education: Wagner College, B.A., 1954; New York University, J.D., 1958.
- Notable work: Iran and the Rise of Reza Shah: From Qajar Collapse to Pahlavi Rule (1999), Iran and the West: A Critical Bibliography (1987)
- Father: Dr. Ghasem Ghani

Cyrus Ghani (8 November 1929 – 2015), sometimes spelled Sīrūs Ghanī, was an Iranian-born academic, lawyer, Iranian studies scholar, and film critic. Born in Sabzevar, he also lived in the United States and in London.

Ghani's published works include Iran and the West: A Critical Bibliography (1987), Iran and the Rise of Reza Shah (1998), My Favorite Films (2004), A Man of Many Worlds: The Diaries and Memoirs of Dr. Ghasem Ghani (2006), an edited volume of the memoirs of his father, Ghasem Ghani, and Shakespeare, Persia, and the East (2008) Ghani died in New York in 2015.

== Notable works ==
- Iran and the West: A Critical Bibliography (1987)
- Iran and the Rise of Reza Shah (1998)
- My Favorite Films (2004)
- A Man of Many Worlds: The Diaries and Memoirs of Dr. Ghasem Ghani (2006)
- Shakespeare, Persia, and the East (2008)
