= Persian Constitution of 1906 =

Fundamental law of Qajar Iran

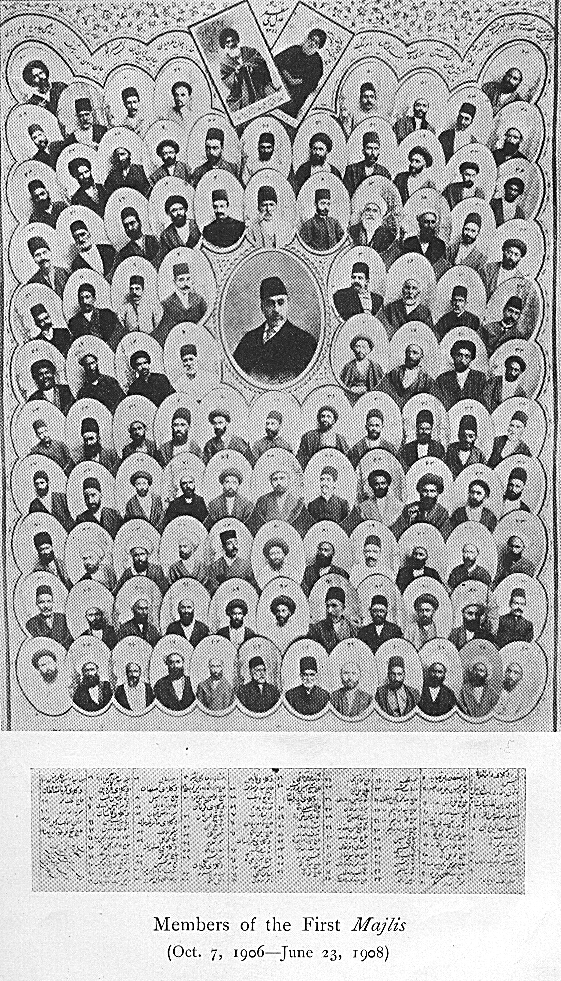
- Members of the First Majlis (7 October 1906 — 23 June 1908). The central photograph is that of Morteza Gholi Khan Hedayat, aka Sani-ol Dowleh, the first Chairman of the First Majlis. He had been for seven months the Finance Minister when he was assassinated on 6 February 1911 by two Georgian nationals in Tehran.
- Location: Qajar Iran
- Media type: Constitution

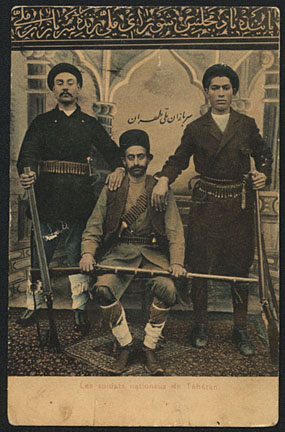
Three National Soldiers of Tehran. A postcard of the period. The text in the heading reads: May the National Consultative Assembly [Majles-e Shoura-ye Milli] be everlasting and long live National Soldiers! The text in the middle of the photograph reads: National Soldiers of Tehran.

The Persian Constitution of 1906 (Persian: قانون اساسی مشروطه, romanized: Qānun-e Asāsi-ye Mashrute), was the first constitution of the Sublime State of Iran (Persia) and a result of the Persian Constitutional Revolution. It was written by Hassan Pirnia, Hossein Pirnia, Esmail Momtaz od-Dowleh, among others; and granted by Mozaffar ad-Din Shah Qajar as one of his final acts. The Constitution was also in effect during Pahlavi Iran. It is divided into five chapters with many articles that developed over several years. The Quran was the foundation of the constitution while the Belgian constitution served as a partial model, which guaranteed each citizen equality before the law, and a safeguarding of personal honour, property and speech.

== The electoral and fundamental laws of 1906 ==
The electoral and fundamental laws of 1906 established the electoral system and the internal frameworks of the Majlis (Parliament) and the Senate.

By the royal proclamation of 5 August 1906, Mozaffar ad-Din Shah Qajar created this first constitution "for the peace and tranquility of all the people of Persia". Mohammad Ali Shah Qajar is credited with chapters 4 and 5.

=== The electoral law of 9 September 1906 ===
The electoral law of 9 September 1906 defined the regulations for the Elections to the Majlis.

==== Disenfranchised ====
Article 3 of this chapter stated that (1) women, (2) foreigners, (3) those under 25, (4) "persons notorious for mischievous opinions," (5) those with a criminal record, (6) active military personnel, and a few other groups are not permitted to vote.

==== Election qualifications ====
Article 4 stated that the elected must be (1) fully literate in Persian, (2) "they must be Iranian subjects of Iranian extraction," (3) "be locally known," (4) "not be in government employment," (5) be between 30 and 70 years old, and (6) "have some insight into affairs of State."

Article 7 asserted, "Each elector has one vote and can only vote in one [social] class."

=== The fundamental laws of 30 December 1906 ===
The fundamental laws of 30 December 1906 defined the role of the Majlis in the system and its framework. It further defined a bicameral legislature. Article 1 established the National Consultative Assembly based "on justice." Article 43 stated, "There shall be constituted another Assembly, entitled the Senate."

== Constitutional Amendment of 1907 ==
Among the topics discussed in the amendment, was the declaration of Twelver Shi'ism as the state religion and establishment of a council of five high ranking Twelver Shia clerics tasked to make sure the laws passed by the parliament are not against the laws of Islam. Also among the topics were articles about the rights of the people and articles describing the flag of Iran and setting Tehran as the capital of the country.

== See also ==
- Constitutionalization attempts in Iran
- 1949 Iranian Constituent Assembly
- 1963 Iranian referendum
- Constitution of Islamic Republic of Iran
