= Mostowfi ol-Mamalek =

Iranian politician

Mirza Hasan Ashtiani Mostowfi ol-Mamalek
- ‌حسن آشتیانی
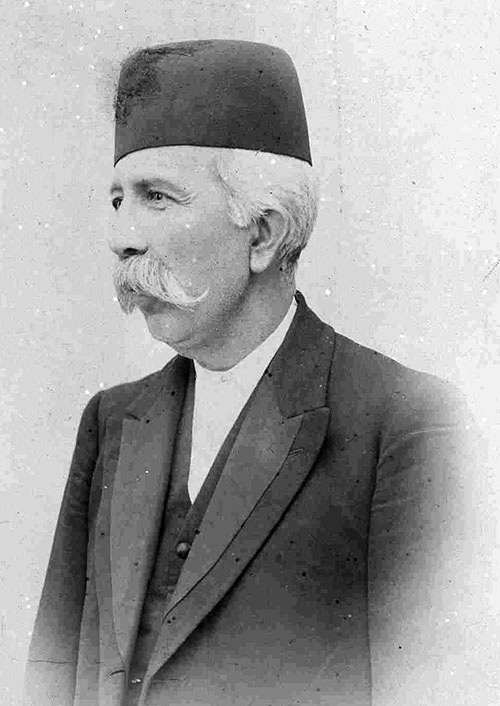

6th Prime Minister of Iran
- In office 25 July 1910 – 12 March 1911
- Monarch: Ahmad Shah Qajar
- Preceded by: Mohammad Vali Khan Tonekaboni
- Succeeded by: Mohammad Vali Khan Tonekaboni
- In office 17 August 1913 – 14 March 1915
- Monarch: Ahmad Shah Qajar
- Preceded by: Mohammad Ali Ala al- Saltaneh
- Succeeded by: Hassan Pirnia
- In office 18 August 1915 – 24 December 1915
- Monarch: Ahmad Shah Qajar
- Deputy: Hossein Pirnia
- Preceded by: Abdol Majid Mirza
- Succeeded by: Abdol-Hossein Mirza Farmanfarma
- In office 16 January 1918 – 1 May 1918
- Monarch: Ahmad Shah Qajar
- Preceded by: Abdol Majid Mirza
- Succeeded by: Najaf-Qoli Samsam al-Saltaneh
- In office 15 February 1923 – 15 June 1923
- Monarch: Ahmad Shah Qajar
- Preceded by: Ahmad Qavam
- Succeeded by: Hassan Pirnia
- In office 13 June 1926 – 2 June 1927
- Monarch: Reza Shah
- Preceded by: Mohammad Ali Foroughi (Acting); Reza Khan Sardar Sepah
- Succeeded by: Mehdi Qoli Hedayat

Personal details
- Born: Mirza Hasan Ashtiani; 5 October 1871 Ashtian, Qajar Iran
- Died: 28 August 1932 (aged 60) Tehran, Pahlavi Iran
- Resting place: Alzahra University
- Party: Revival Party (1920s); Democrat Party (1910s)
- Spouse: Esmat el Molouk
- Children: Mirza Yousof Mostowfi al-Mamalek II
- Parent: Mirza Yusuf Ashtiani

Mirza Hasan Ashtiani (Persian: میرزا حسن آشتیانی), commonly known by the bestowed title Mostowfi ol-Mamalek (Persian: مستوفی‌الممالک, lit. 'Chancellor of the Realm'; 5 October 1871 – 28 August 1932) was an Iranian politician and statesman who served as the prime minister of Iran on six occasions from 1910 to 1927.

== Early life ==
Mostowfi al-Mamalek came from an important aristocratic and well-known family of high-ranking bureaucrats during the Qajar era, originally from the province of Ashtian. The family are said to have their origins with the Safavids. Mostowfi's father was Mirza Yousof Mostowfi al-Mamalek, a bureaucrat of the Qajar court, Naser al-Din Shah's grand vizier and a prime minister. His father was also assigned to determine the new reaches of the city of Tehran when the population reached 150,000. His grandfather was Mirza Hasan Mostowfi al-Mamalek I and was given the title of Mostofi al Mamalek under Mohammad Shah Qajar. Mostowfi was also second cousins with Mohammad Mosaddegh, who served as Iran's Prime Minister from 1951 to 1953.

One year before his father's death, Naser al-Din Shah Qajar granted the title Mostowfi ol-Mamalek ("chief financier of the country") to the very young Hasan. The Mostowfi ol-Mamalek family passed on the central office at the finance ministry from father to son throughout the 19th century and until the 1920s.

When the nobility started to ridicule Hasan for being given such an important job/title at such young age, Naser al-Din Shah, convinced of the young boy's talents, added the title "Aaqaa" (Sir) to Hasan's titles, thereby obliging the nobility to call him "Sir" every time they addressed him. He was since frequently referred to simply as "Aaqaa" in political circles. However, there is a source that suggests that it was his generosity that earned him the title "Aaqaa", rather than it being bestowed upon him.

His education began at the age of five under the tutelage of Mahmud Khan Malekalshoara. He studied all customary subjects such as Arabic grammar and literature, but he also had a good command of the French language.

In 1885, subsequent to his father's death, he undertook all his responsibilities under Mosaddegh's father, Mirza Hedayatollah Vizier Daftar's supervision.

At the age of 18, he married Nasr-ol-Din Shah's granddaughter, Khanom Esmat el Molouk, and became a member of the royal family.

== European travel and the creation of the Society for Humanity ==
After a series of disagreements with the newly instated Mozaffar ad-Din Shah, Mostowfi al-Mamalek travelled to Paris from 1900 to 1907. During this period he visited many European countries and observed their systems of government. During his trips to Europe, Mozaffar ad-Din Shah gave him multiple invitations to return to Iran, however he declined. In the year 1907, after the Persian Constitutional Revolution and the death of Mozaffar ad-Din Shah, Mostowfi al-Mamalek returned to Iran accompanied by Ali Asghar Khan, who had just been appointed Prime Minister of Iran by Mohammad Ali Shah Qajar.

Soon after his return he set up a humanitarian society called the Society for Humanity, Jameeyate Ensaniat, with Mohammad Mosaddegh as his deputy. The society met regularly at Mostowfi's residence and eventually became part of the inter-society confederation, with Mossadegh as their permanent representative.

== Political career ==
During the Persian Constitutional Revolution era, Mostowfi was appointed Minister 15 times, and Prime Minister 6 times. At various points in his career he held the positions of prime minister, minister of war, majlis member and minister without portfolio. This was in part due to the political turmoil in Iran at the time which often saw governments only last several months before being replaced.

=== Popularity and character ===
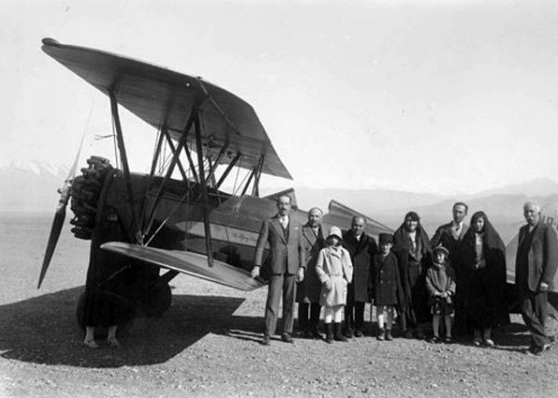
Hassan Mostowfi (first person, standing on the right) with his family at a private airfield in Dushan Tappeh.

Mostowfi has been considered as one of the most popular Iranian politicians of the 20th century. Like his father, Mostowfi is said to have carried himself as a gentleman and was considered kind, honest, steadfast, humble and generous. During his service to Iran, Mostowfi stood up to British and Russian influence in Iran, especially during World War I, giving credence to his reputation as a person of character and integrity. It has been noted that, unlike some of his contemporaries, Mostowfi was patriotic and did not engage with foreign powers in order to preserve or boost his own financial or political standings.

=== Criticism ===
Despite his perceived popularity Mostowfi has at times been criticised for being unable to form a strong government with the ability to exercise what it presented to the Majlis. It has also been suggested that on occasion Mostowfi showed a lack of strong leadership.

=== Imperial allegiances ===
Sources disagree on his allegiances to foreign powers with some claiming he was a Russophile and others stating he favoured the Germans and Turks.

== Prime minister ==
=== The First Term ===
Sometime after his return to Iran, Mostowfi became the minister of war until the bombardment of Majlis. Following the conquest of Tehran, first he was appointed the minister of finance in Sepahdar Azam's cabinet and then became the minister of Ahmad Shah Qajar's court. Following to the resignation of Sepadar's first cabinet, he became Ahmad Shah’s prime minister. Mostowfi's first term as Prime Minister of Iran began in July 1910 during the 2nd Majlis. His party, Melliyoun Democrats, were mostly young, well educated and had travelled to Europe. They were in favour of the separation of church and state; taxing the landowners and businesses; adopting compulsory national service and borrowing internally instead of internationally. Mostowfi's cabinet, backed by the Democrats, was known as the "Young Peoples' Cabinet".

During his first term Mostowfi faced the issue of security in Iran. Multiple assassinations of political and religious figures occurred. Mostowfi decided to stop these assassinations and declared that all private citizens turn in their arms. Almost all pro-Democrat forces obliged, however some pro-Moderates forces ignored the order, including Sattar Khan. As a result of the pro-Moderates forces actions the government used the newly appointed Tehran police chief, Yeprem Khan to exercise the order. With this Mostowfi proved he was able to make tough decisions when necessary.

During his term in office the government received a letter from the British and Russian Ministers in Tehran complaining about the lack of security on the Bushehr–Shiraz–Isfahan road. The British stated that the Iranian government had three months to rectify the problem. If they failed they would bring in 1500 Indian soldiers under British command to safeguard the route. Mostowfi's government responded by creating the Swedish Gendarmerie, seeing this as a way to keep Iran independent of British involvement in internal security.

With the death of the Regent in September 1910 Parliament was convened to elect the next Regent. The candidates were Mostowfi and Mirza Abolghasem Khan Naser ol Molk. Mostowfi lost the election.

=== The Second Term ===
Mostowfi's second appointment as prime minister coincided with the onset of World War I. Iran had declared neutrality in the war and the country further reinforced its neutral stance by appointing Mostowfi, who was known to support neutrality. However, his government leaned towards the German and the Turks. Being pro-German in this regard was simply seen as a political move to support a third nation that may aid in curbing the influence of the British and Russians in Iran.

Mostowfi approached the Russian authorities and asked that they withdraw their troops from Azerbaijan as their presence gave the Turks a reason to invade. The Russians responded by asking what guarantees could be given that their withdrawal would not be followed by the insertion of the Turks. The absence of a centralised state in Iran can help explain why Mostowfi's cabinet, and the Shah, were both impotent on this matter.

In this second term Mostowfi also showed he was taking a stance in relation to the modernisation of Iran. In the program of his second cabinet Mostowfi proposed the abolition of the old pensions system, completion of the new Code, the founding of a secular law school to train personnel for the Ministry of Justice, the founding of several schools for girls and new laws to govern telegraphic communications. These proposals were rejected by the Majlis in 1914.

Mostowfi was also elected as MP for Tehran, but resigned in order to become prime minister. His manifesto included several concepts that the Third Majlis passed including laws such as the Military Conscription Act, Ministry of Finance constitution bill and Real Estate tax law.

Mostowfi resigned from his position after both his neutral and withdrawal of Russian forces policies failed.

=== The Third Term ===
In August 1915, less than six months after resigning, Mostowfi once again was prime minister. By the time he took office, German popularity had increased amongst the nationalists.

During the Third Majlis the Czarist Russian Army expeditionary force left Qazvin for Tehran.

Mostowfi therefore pursued a double-edged policy. He began talks with the British for a loan and for the withdrawal of Russian forces. He also entered into secret negotiations with the Germans for a treaty of cooperation. Mostowfi suggested the Germans guarantee Iranian independence and territorial integrity. Mostowfi also attached a number of stipulations, including the Germans giving Iran a loan and providing officers. If these were all met, his government would be prepared to declare war on the Allies. He also stated that if all stipulations were not met he would have to stop all German activities in Iran.

In a show of good faith the Germans secured the withdrawal of Ottoman Forces and offered to help financially but did not agree to the stipulations. Due to the non-committal answer firm the Germans, the negotiations did not lead to a policy that could be executed. Additionally the Allies had discovered the secret negotiations.

By 7 November 1915, Russian troops were marching on the capital. The German envoy had left the day before and Mostowfi recommend that his deputies and the Shah to also leave and go to Qom. Forty-four deputies, newspaper editors and the Gendarmerie left for Qom. This was known as the ‘emigration’ with the hope of forming a government free of British and Russian Influence. The Shah having initially agreed, had his mind changed by the Russian and British Ministers in Tehran. With this change in mindset any chance of forming an independent government was gone. With the Shah in Tehran, Mostowfi tried to persuade the deputies to return. Mostowfi did not succeed in securing their return and so ended his third term.

=== The Fourth Term ===
Mostowfi's fourth term of office as prime minister was marked by severe drought and famine that devastated the country. By some accounts 25% of those living in the North perished. This was accompanied by the Persian influenza epidemic of 1918 which was rapid and devastating.

=== The Fifth Term ===
Mostowfi's fifth term began in February 1923. The First World War was over and the Russian Revolution was well established. Reza Khan who was then called Sardar Sepah had the post of Minister of War in Mostowfi's cabinet.

One of his most formidable opponents in politics at the time was Hassan Modarres who made numerous efforts to pull down Mostowfi's cabinet.

Mostowfi's cabinet finally collapsed under pressure from political opponents despite the full backing of Ahmad Shah Qajar. During the run-up to the elections for the 5th Majlis, Modarres and his followers in the Parliament were actively campaigning against Mostowfi's cabinet. They tabled a formal question to the government, which was customarily followed by a vote of confidence. The ministers answered the questions convincingly. Mostowfi, who was not used to this kind of street politics, was said to be angry and disappointed. He delivered his most famous speech to Parliament, blaming members of Parliament for "giving and taking ajil [dried nuts]", which in Persian means giving and taking bribes. He is believed to have said, "I have problems with my digestive system, and I do not take or give any ajil".

He was the first prime minister to call Parliamentarians corrupt instead of cajoling and flattering them. He and his ministers left the Parliament, went straight to the Shah and resigned.

Hassan Modarres went on to abolish the 1919 accord between Iran and the Great Britain.

=== The Sixth Term ===
Despite his opposition to Mostowfi, Modarres was part of the party that encouraged Mostowfi to take his sixth term as prime minister. Reza Shah had been elected Shah and crowned. In order to legitimise his rule he needed a prime minister who had the confidence of the politicians and the general public, so he chose Mostowfi. Modarres believed that Mostowfi was one of the few people who might curb the excesses of the new Shah and his generals.

Mostowfi's sixth began in June 1926. During this term of office a number of important actions were taken, the most important event during this period had been the abolition of Capitulation on 9 May 1927. This would be the last major event that Mostowfi would be part of and this would be his last post. At the end of May 1927, Mostowfi resigned from office and from political life.

== The Society for National Heritage ==
The Society for National Heritage was formed in 1921 with the aim to preserve, protect and promote "Iran's patrimony". The society built a state museum, a state library and several mausoleums, which incorporated motifs from ancient Iranian architecture. The society was formed by modernist government officials and Westernized intellectuals, and Mostowfi was among them.

Despite Mostowfi's ostensible role in creating Iran's first historical preservation society he was also involved in the removal and sale of Iranian cultural heritage as was the case on the occasion of the Exposition Universelle of 1900 during which Mostowfi and his companions sold ceramic tiles to raise money for themselves after extensive buys.

It was at this time that Mostowfi had the luster mihrab of the Imamzadeh Yahya at Varamin taken out of Iran and transported to Paris where it remained largely in storage until 1913 when it was sold to Armenian-American art dealer Hagop Kevorkian who would later sold it in 1940 to American heiress Doris Duke.

== Death and legacy ==
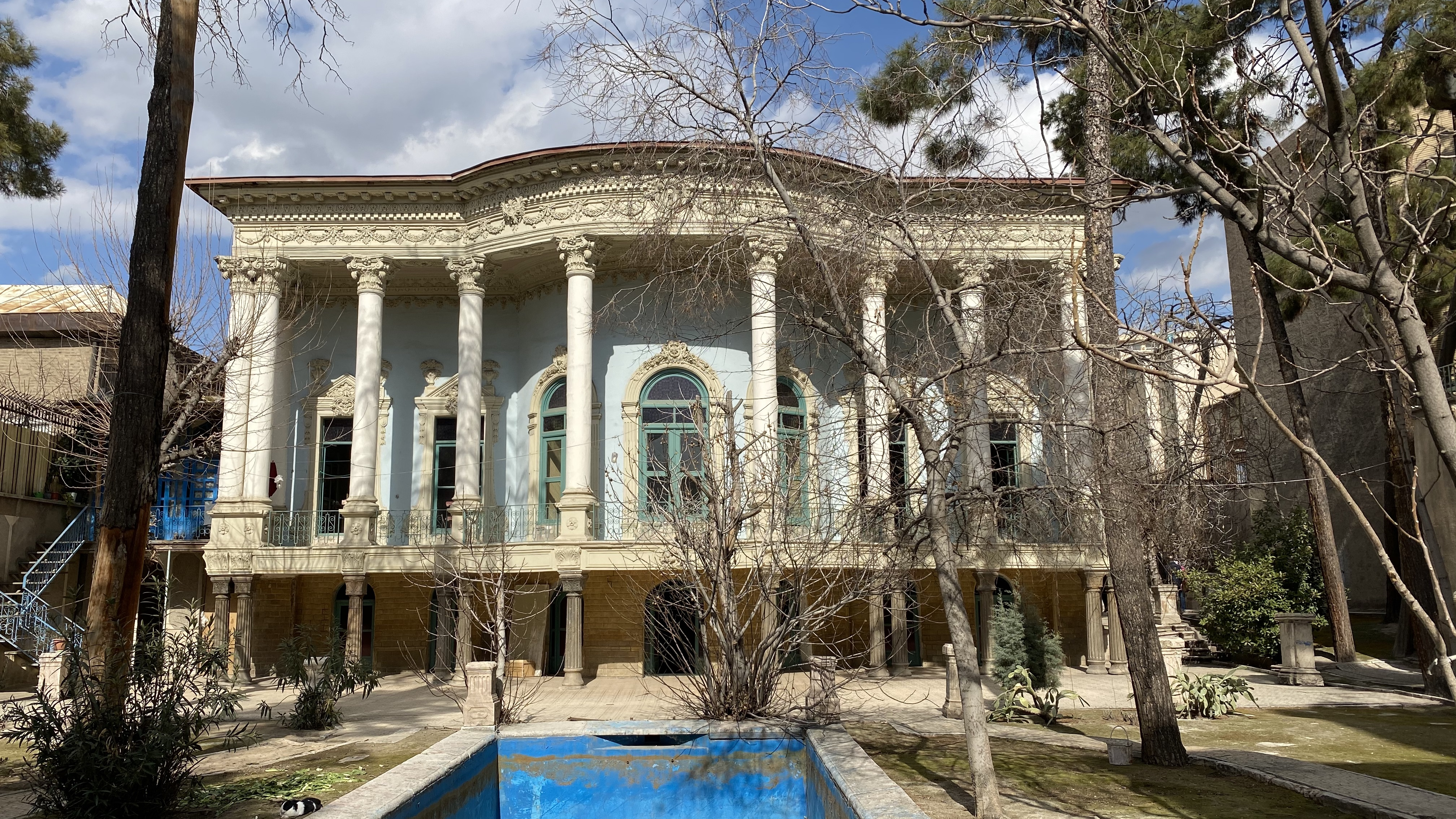
House of Mostowfi in Tehran

Mirza Hassan Mostowfi al Mamalek died of a heart attack on 28 August 1932. He was buried in the family mausoleum in Vanak village. The funeral procession was marked by the Armenian residents of Vanak carrying the coffin for a mile to the Mausoleum, followed by a procession of 80 or more cars. The mausoleum is currently on the grounds of Alzahra University.

Mostowfi had several children including a son, Mirza Yousof Mostowfi al-Mamalek II, who may have been named after his father.

His descendants now bear the surname "Mostofi al-Mamaleki", "Mostowfi", "Tahriri", "Dabiri".

=== Hassan Abad Square ===
The square and the buildings around it were built in a ten-year period. Hassan Abad was built by Mirza Yousof Mostowfi al-Mamalek, Naser ed-Din Shah's vizier. He named the place after his son Mirza Hassan Mostofi al-Mamalek. It was inspired by the Renaissance architecture, and adapted from the works of Palladio, the Italian architect of the Renaissance period.

Following the Iranian revolution in 1979, the square was renamed to "31st of Shahrivar Square", however the new name did not stick and it is still known as "Hassan Abad Square".

== See also ==
- Pahlavi dynasty
- List of prime ministers of Iran

Political offices
| Preceded by Mohammad Vali Khan Tonekaboni | Prime Minister of Iran; 1910-1911 | Succeeded by Mohammad Vali Khan Tonekaboni |
| Preceded by Mohammad-Ali Ala al-Saltaneh | Prime Minister of Iran; 1913-1915 | Succeeded by Hassan Pirnia |
| Preceded by Abdol Majid Mirza | Prime Minister of Iran; 1915 | Succeeded by Abdol-Hossein Mirza Farmanfarma |
| Preceded by Abdol Majid Mirza | Prime Minister of Iran; 1917 | Succeeded by Najaf-Qoli Samsam al-Saltaneh |
| Preceded by Ahmad Qavam | Prime Minister of Iran; 1923 | Succeeded by Hassan Pirnia |
| Preceded by Mohammad-Ali Foroughi | Prime Minister of Iran; 1926-1927 | Succeeded by Mehdi Qoli Hedayat |
Non-profit organization positions
| Vacant Title last held by Mohammad Hassan Mirza | Chairman of the Iranian Red Lion and Sun Society; 1927–1931 | Succeeded by Reza Shah |
