= Hassan Pirnia =

Iranian politician (1871–1935)

Hassan Pirnia Moshir od-Dowleh
- حسن پیرنیا
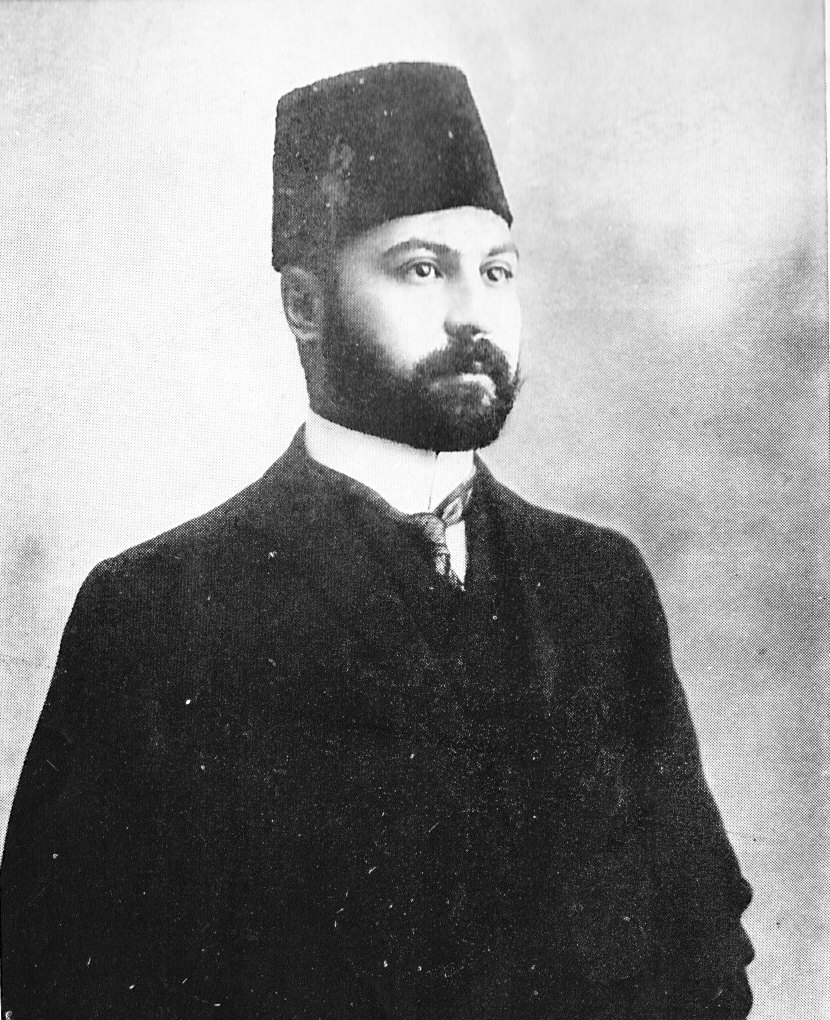
- Formal portrait, c. 1909

9th Prime Minister of Iran
- In office 14 March 1915 – 1 May 1915
- Monarch: Ahmad Shah Qajar
- Preceded by: Mostowfi ol-Mamalek
- Succeeded by: Abdol Majid Mirza
- In office 3 July 1920 – 27 October 1920
- Monarch: Ahmad Shah Qajar
- Preceded by: Vossug ed Dowleh
- Succeeded by: Fathollah Khan Akbar
- In office 21 January 1922 – 22 June 1922
- Monarch: Ahmad Shah Qajar
- Preceded by: Ahmad Qavam
- Succeeded by: Ahmad Qavam
- In office 15 June 1923 – 26 October 1923
- Monarch: Ahmad Shah Qajar
- Preceded by: Mostowfi ol-Mamalek
- Succeeded by: Reza Pahlavi

Personal details
- Born: 1871 Nain, Sublime State of Iran
- Died: 20 November 1935 (aged 64) Tehran, Imperial State of Iran
- Party: Moderate Socialists Party
- Parent: Mirza Nasrullah Khan (father)

Hassan Pirnia (Persian: حسن پیرنیا; 1871 – 20 November 1935), titled Moshir-od-Dowleh (Persian: مشیرالدوله), was a prominent politician of early 20th-century Iran. He held a total of twenty-four posts during his political career, serving four times as Prime Minister of Iran. He was also a historian, co-founding the Society for the National Heritage of Iran.

== Personal life ==
Hassan was the eldest son of Mirza Nasrullah Khan, a Prime Minister during the Qajar era. Hassan also had a younger brother named Hossein, who served as speaker of the Parliament of Iran.

== Career ==
Hassan became Iran's minister to the Russian Court before returning to Iran, where he founded the Tehran School of Political Science in 1899.

Upon his father's death, he assumed the title of Moshir od-Dowleh, playing an important role in drafting the Persian Constitution of 1906. Hassan was given an Honorary Knight Grand Cross of the Most Distinguished Order of Saint Michael and Saint George by the British crown in 1907. From 1907 to 1908, Pirnia was the minister of foreign affairs, during which time he declared the Anglo-Russian Convention, which would divide Iran into zones of imperial influence, as null and void.

He later became minister of justice before becoming prime minister for the first time in 1915. He would re-assume the office in 1920, and again in 1922 and 1923. One of Pirnia's key actions during his time as prime minister saw him help prevent the introduction of the Anglo-Persian Agreement of 1919.

During his final period as prime minister, Pirnia appointed Mohammad Mosaddegh as his foreign minister, retaining Reza Khan as his minister of war.

== Books and cultural contributions ==
Following his retirement, he published a three-volume history of pre-Islamic Iran, entitled Tarikh-e Iran-e Bastan (History of Ancient Iran), this work was a major shift in Persian historiography, as it used Greek sources, and attempted to integrate the Achaemenids into Iran's historiography. An abridged version, Tarikh-e Mokhtasar-e Iran-e Qadim, published in 1928, became a standard textbook for students. Pirnia's other significant contributions to the cultural life of Iran included helping to set up the Society for the National Heritage of Iran along with Abdolhossein Teymourtash and Mohammad Ali Foroughi in 1922.

Hassan's younger brother, Hossein Pirnia, was also a notable statesman during this period. Known as Mo'tamen ol-Molk, he served as Minister of Education in 1918 and Minister without portfolio in 1920. He was elected to every session of the parliament (Majlis) from 1906 and served as its speaker for many years. In 1943 he was elected from Tehran to the 14th session of Parliament but declined to serve.

Political offices
Preceded by Mostowfi ol-Mamalek	Prime Minister of Iran; 1915	Succeeded by Abdol Majid Mirza
Preceded by Vossug ed Dowleh	Prime Minister of Iran; 1920	Succeeded by Fathollah Khan Akbar
Preceded by Ahmad Qavam	Prime Minister of Iran; 1922	Succeeded by Ahmad Qavam
Preceded by Mostowfi ol-Mamalek	Prime Minister of Iran; 1923	Succeeded by Reza Khan
