= List of elections and referendums in Iran =

This is an overview of all elections and referendums held in Iran since the first time in 1906.

== List ==
Year	Date	Election	Head of state	Notes
1906	July	Parliament (I)	Mozaffareddin Shah	Revolution
1907	—N/a		Mohammad Ali Shah	—N/a
1908	—N/a		Mohammad Ali Shah	Coup d'état
1909	?	Parliament (II)	Ahmad Shah	Civil War
1910	—N/a		Ahmad Shah	—N/a
1911	—N/a		Ahmad Shah	Russian Occupation
1912	—N/a		Ahmad Shah	Russian Occupation
1913	—N/a		Ahmad Shah	Russian Occupation
1914	?	Parliament (III)	Ahmad Shah	World War I British/Russian/Ottoman Occupation
1915	—N/a		Ahmad Shah	World War I British/Russian/Ottoman Occupation
1916	—N/a		Ahmad Shah	World War I British/Russian/Ottoman Occupation
1917	—N/a		Ahmad Shah	World War I British/Russian/Ottoman Occupation
1918	—N/a		Ahmad Shah	World War I British/Russian/Ottoman Occupation
1919	—N/a		Ahmad Shah	—N/a
1920	—N/a		Ahmad Shah	—N/a
1921	?	Parliament (IV)	Ahmad Shah	Coup d'état
1922	—N/a		Ahmad Shah	—N/a
1923	November	Parliament (V) (Note: Rigged in the shahrestans)	Ahmad Shah	—N/a
1924	—N/a		Ahmad Shah	—N/a
1925	?	Constituent Assembly (I)	Ahmad Shah	New dynasty established
1926	?–27 June	Parliament (VI)	Reza Shah	—N/a
1927	—N/a		Reza Shah	—N/a
1928	?	Parliament (VII) (Note: Vast fraud nationwide by the court and military)	Reza Shah	—N/a
1929	—N/a		Reza Shah	—N/a
1930	?	Parliament (VIII)	Reza Shah	—N/a
1931	—N/a		Reza Shah	—N/a
1932	?	Parliament (IX)	Reza Shah	—N/a
1933	—N/a		Reza Shah	—N/a
1934	—N/a		Reza Shah	—N/a
1935	?	Parliament (X)	Reza Shah	—N/a
1936	—N/a		Reza Shah	—N/a
1937	?	Parliament (XI)	Reza Shah	—N/a
1938	—N/a		Reza Shah	—N/a
1939	?	Parliament (XII)	Reza Shah	—N/a
1940	—N/a		Reza Shah	—N/a
1941	?	Parliament (XIII)	Mohammad Reza Shah	World War II; British/Soviet Occupation
1942	—N/a		Mohammad Reza Shah	World War II; British/Soviet Occupation
1943	November–February	Parliament (XIV)	Mohammad Reza Shah	World War II; British/Soviet Occupation
1944	November–February	Parliament (XIV)	Mohammad Reza Shah	—N/a
1945	—N/a		Mohammad Reza Shah	—N/a
1946	—N/a		Mohammad Reza Shah	—N/a
1947	January–?	Parliament (XV) (Note: Fraudulent)	Mohammad Reza Shah	—N/a
1948	—N/a		Mohammad Reza Shah	—N/a
1949	?	Constituent Assembly (II)	Mohammad Reza Shah	—N/a
1949	August–?	Senate (I)	Mohammad Reza Shah	—N/a
1950	?	Parliament (XVI)	Mohammad Reza Shah	—N/a
1951	—N/a		Mohammad Reza Shah	—N/a
1952	?	Parliament (XVII) (Note: Election suspended)	Mohammad Reza Shah	—N/a
1953	3–10 August	Referendum (I)	Mohammad Reza Shah	Coup d'état
1954	?	Parliament (XVIII)	Mohammad Reza Shah	—N/a
1954	?	Senate (II)	Mohammad Reza Shah	—N/a
1955	—N/a		Mohammad Reza Shah	—N/a
1956	?	Parliament (XIX)	Mohammad Reza Shah	—N/a
1957	—N/a		Mohammad Reza Shah	—N/a
1958	—N/a		Mohammad Reza Shah	—N/a
1959	—N/a		Mohammad Reza Shah	—N/a
1960	?	Senate (III)	Mohammad Reza Shah	—N/a
1960	30 July–20 August	Parliament (XX) (Note: Results annulled)	Mohammad Reza Shah	—N/a
1961	?	Parliament (XX)	Mohammad Reza Shah	—N/a
1962	—N/a		Mohammad Reza Shah	—N/a
1963	26 January	Referendum (II)	Mohammad Reza Shah	—N/a
1963	17 September	Parliament (XXI)	Mohammad Reza Shah	—N/a
1963	17 September	Senate (IV)	Mohammad Reza Shah	—N/a
1964	—N/a		Mohammad Reza Shah	—N/a
1965	—N/a		Mohammad Reza Shah	—N/a
1966	—N/a		Mohammad Reza Shah	—N/a
1967	4 August	Parliament (XXII)	Mohammad Reza Shah	—N/a
1967	4 August	Senate (V)	Mohammad Reza Shah	—N/a
1967	4 August	Constituent Assembly (III)	Mohammad Reza Shah	—N/a
1968	—N/a		Mohammad Reza Shah	—N/a
1969	—N/a		Mohammad Reza Shah	—N/a
1970	—N/a		Mohammad Reza Shah	—N/a
1971	9 July	Parliament (XXIII)	Mohammad Reza Shah	—N/a
1971	9 July	Senate (VI)	Mohammad Reza Shah	—N/a
1972	—N/a		Mohammad Reza Shah	—N/a
1973	—N/a		Mohammad Reza Shah	—N/a
1974	—N/a		Mohammad Reza Shah	—N/a
1975	20 June	Parliament (XXIV)	Mohammad Reza Shah	—N/a
1975	20 June	Senate (VII)	Mohammad Reza Shah	—N/a
1976	—N/a		Mohammad Reza Shah	—N/a
1977	—N/a		Mohammad Reza Shah	—N/a
1978	—N/a		Mohammad Reza Shah	—N/a
1979	30–31 March	Referendum (III)	Ruhollah Khomeini	Islamic Revolution
1979	3 August	Constituent Assembly (IV)	Ruhollah Khomeini	Islamic Revolution
1979	2–3 December	Referendum (IV)	Ruhollah Khomeini	Islamic Revolution
1980	25 January	President (I)	Ruhollah Khomeini	War with Iraq
1980	14 March/9 May	Parliament (XXV)	Ruhollah Khomeini	War with Iraq
1981	24 July	President (II)	Ruhollah Khomeini	War with Iraq
1981	2 October	President (III)	Ruhollah Khomeini	War with Iraq
1982	10 December	Assembly of Experts (I)	Ruhollah Khomeini	War with Iraq
1983	—N/a		Ruhollah Khomeini	War with Iraq
1984	15 April/17 May	Parliament (XXVI)	Ruhollah Khomeini	War with Iraq
1985	16 August	President (IV)	Ruhollah Khomeini	War with Iraq
1986	—N/a		Ruhollah Khomeini	War with Iraq
1987	—N/a		Ruhollah Khomeini	War with Iraq
1988	8 April/13 May	Parliament (XXVII)	Ruhollah Khomeini	War with Iraq
1989	28 July	President (V)	Ali Khamenei	—N/a
1989	28 July	Referendum (V)	Ali Khamenei	—N/a
1989	4 June/6 August	Supreme Leader (II)	Ali Khamenei	—N/a
1990	8 October	Assembly of Experts (II)	Ali Khamenei	—N/a
1991	—N/a		Ali Khamenei	—N/a
1992	10 April/8 May	Parliament (XXVIII)	Ali Khamenei	—N/a
1993	11 June	President (VI)	Ali Khamenei	—N/a
1994	—N/a		Ali Khamenei	—N/a
1995	—N/a		Ali Khamenei	—N/a
1996	8 March/19 April	Parliament (XXIX)	Ali Khamenei	—N/a
1997	23 May	President (VII)	Ali Khamenei	—N/a
1998	23 October	Assembly of Experts (III)	Ali Khamenei	—N/a
1999	26 February	Local (I)	Ali Khamenei	—N/a
2000	18 February/5 May	Parliament (XXX)	Ali Khamenei	—N/a
2001	8 June	President (VIII)	Ali Khamenei	—N/a
2002	—N/a		Ali Khamenei	—N/a
2003	28 February	Local (II)	Ali Khamenei	—N/a
2004	20 February/7 May	Parliament (XXXI)	Ali Khamenei	—N/a
2005	17/24 June	President (IX)	Ali Khamenei	—N/a
2006	15 December	Assembly of Experts (IV)	Ali Khamenei	—N/a
2006	15 December	Local (III)	Ali Khamenei	—N/a
2007	—N/a		Ali Khamenei	—N/a
2008	14 March/25 April	Parliament (XXXII)	Ali Khamenei	—N/a
2009	12 June	President (X) (Note: Protests escalated for alleged manipulation)	Ali Khamenei	—N/a
2010	—N/a		Ali Khamenei	—N/a
2011	—N/a		Ali Khamenei	—N/a
2012	2 March/4 May	Parliament (XXXIII)	Ali Khamenei	—N/a
2013	14 June	President (XI)	Ali Khamenei	—N/a
2013	14 June	Local (IV)	Ali Khamenei	—N/a
2014	—N/a		Ali Khamenei	—N/a
2015	—N/a		Ali Khamenei	—N/a
2016	26 February/29 April	Assembly of Experts (V)	Ali Khamenei	—N/a
2016	26 February/29 April	Parliament (XXXIV)	Ali Khamenei	—N/a
2017	19 May	President (XII)	Ali Khamenei	—N/a
2017	19 May	Local (V)	Ali Khamenei	—N/a
2018	—N/a		Ali Khamenei	—N/a
2019	—N/a		Ali Khamenei	—N/a
2020	21 February/11 September	Parliament (XXXV)	Ali Khamenei	COVID-19 pandemic
2021	18 June	President (XIII)	Ali Khamenei	COVID-19 pandemic
2021	18 June	Local (VI)	Ali Khamenei	COVID-19 pandemic
2022	—N/a		Ali Khamenei	—N/a
2023	—N/a		Ali Khamenei	—N/a
2024	1 March	Assembly of Experts (VI)	Ali Khamenei	—N/a
2024	1 March/10 May	Parliament (XXXVI)	Ali Khamenei	—N/a
2024	28 June	President (XIV)	Ali Khamenei	—N/a
2025	19 June	Local (VII)	Ali Khamenei	—N/a
2026	3-8 March	Supreme Leader (III)	Mojtaba Khamenei	Iran war

== See also ==
- Elections in Iran
