= List of prime ministers of Iran =

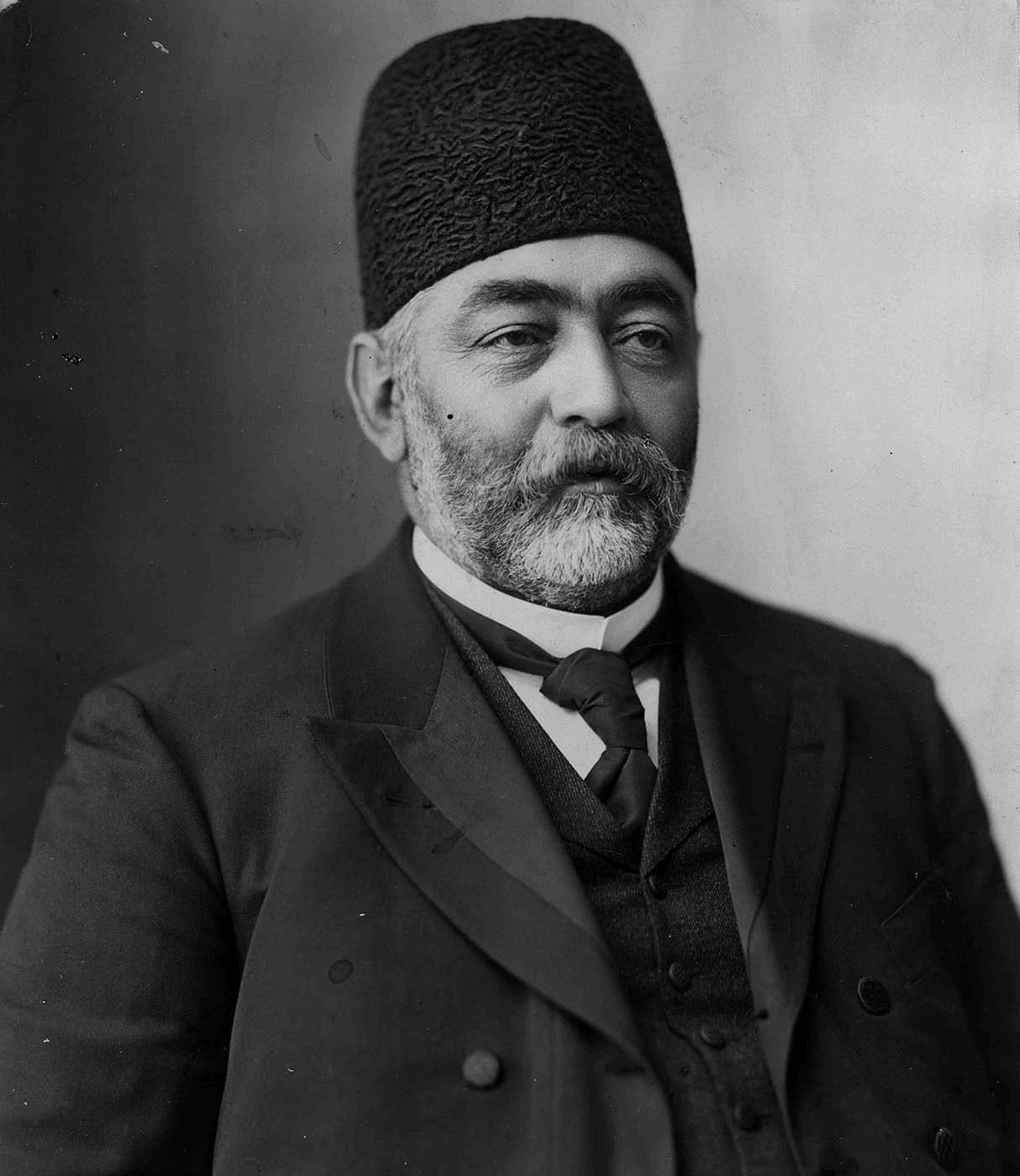
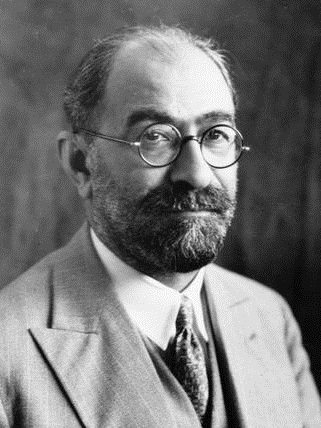
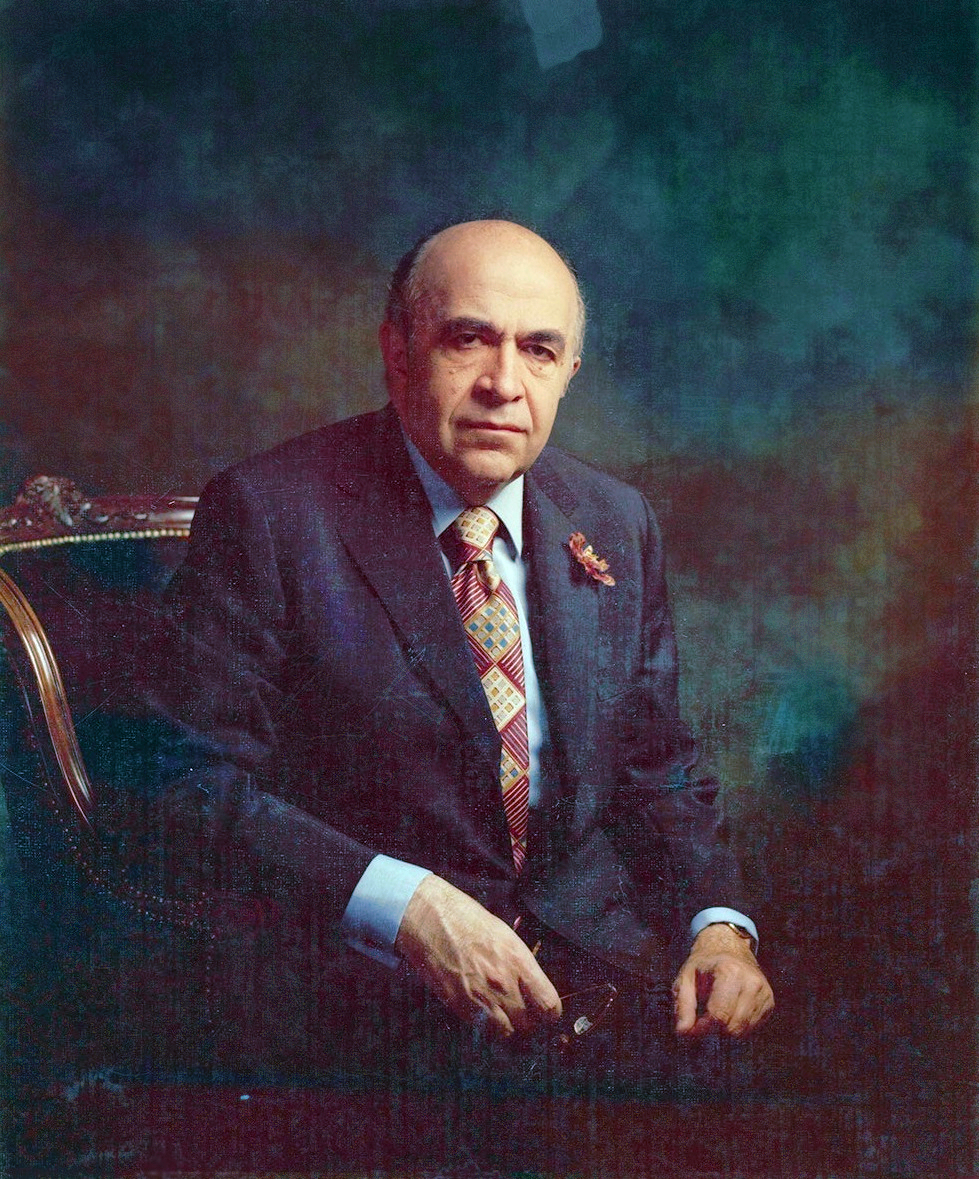
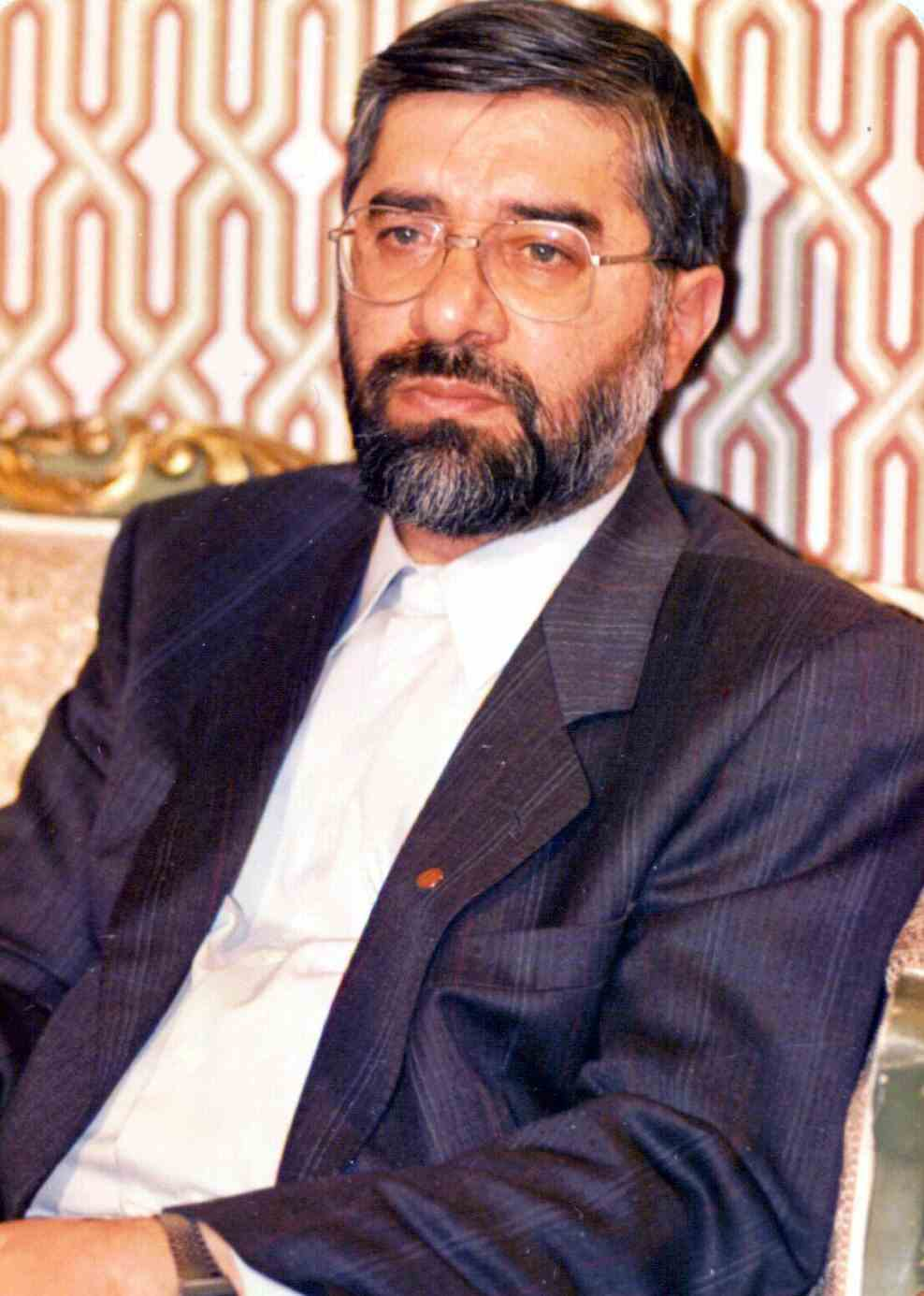
- Top left: Ali Asghar Khan Atabak, the first prime minister of Iran.
- Top right: Mohammad Ali Foroughi, the prime minister who was in this position during the replacement of the Qajar dynasty with the Pahlavi dynasty.
- Bottom left: Amir-Abbas Hoveyda, the longest-serving prime minister of Iran.
- Bottom right: Mir-Hossein Mousavi, the last prime minister of Iran.

The office of Prime Minister of Iran was established in 1907 during the Persian Constitutional Revolution and existed until 1989 when the office was abolished after a constitutional referendum. The prime minister was the head of government of Iran.

Ali Asghar Khan Atabak was the first and Mir-Hossein Mousavi was the last prime minister of Iran. Before the Constitutional Revolution, the head of government was called the Grand Vizier (Sadr-e A'zam or Vazir-e A'zam).

== List of officeholders ==
Political party key

Moderate Socialists
Democrats
Reformers' Party
Revival Party
Democrat Party
National Front
Nationalists' Party
People's Party
New Iran Party
Rastakhiz Party
Freedom Movement
Islamic Association of Teachers of Iran
Islamic Republican Party
Combatant Clergy Association
Independent
Military

No.	Portrait	Name (Birth–Death)	Term of office			Political party	Election	Government	Head of state (Reign / Term)	Ref.
No.	Portrait	Name (Birth–Death)	Took office	Left office	Time in office	Political party	Election	Government	Head of state (Reign / Term)	Ref.
• Sublime State of Persia (1907–1925) •
—		Soltan-Ali Vazir-e Afkham سلطان‌علی وزیر افخم (1862–1914) acting	21 March 1907	29 April 1907	39 days	Independent	—	Interim	Mohammad Ali Shah Qajar (1907–1909)	
1		Ali-Asghar Khan Atabak علی اصغر خان اتابک (1858–1907)	4 May 1907	31 August 1907 X	119 days	Independent	—		Mohammad Ali Shah Qajar (1907–1909)	
2		Ahmad Moshir al-Saltaneh احمد مشیرالسلطنه (1844–1918)	16 September 1907	27 October 1907	41 days	Independent	—		Mohammad Ali Shah Qajar (1907–1909)	
3		Abolqasem Naser ol-Molk ابوالقاسم ناصرالملک (1856–1927)	27 October 1907	21 December 1907	55 days	Independent	—		Mohammad Ali Shah Qajar (1907–1909)	
4		Hossein-Qoli Nezam al-Saltaneh Mafi حسینقلی نظام السلطنه مافی (1832–1908)	21 December 1907	21 May 1908	152 days	Independent	—		Mohammad Ali Shah Qajar (1907–1909)	
(2)		Ahmad Moshir al-Saltaneh احمد مشیرالسلطنه (1844–1918)	7 June 1908	29 April 1909	326 days	Independent	—		Mohammad Ali Shah Qajar (1907–1909)	
—		Javad Sa'd al-Dowleh جواد سعدالدوله (1856–1930) acting	8 May 1909	13 July 1909 (deposed)	66 days	Independent	—		Mohammad Ali Shah Qajar (1907–1909)	
Interim Cabinet without Prime Minister کابینه موقت بدون نخست وزیر (Appointed by Supreme Council of Politicians and Clergymen)			17 July 1909	30 September 1909	75 days	—	—		Ahmad Shah Qajar (1909–1925)	
5		Mohammad Vali Khan Khalatbari Tonekaboni محمدولی‌خان خلعتبری تنکابنی (1848–1926)	30 September 1909	25 July 1910	298 days	Moderate Socialists	1909		Ahmad Shah Qajar (1909–1925)	
6		Mostowfi ol-Mamalek مستوفی‌الممالک (1875–1932)	25 July 1910	12 March 1911	230 days	Democrats	—		Ahmad Shah Qajar (1909–1925)	
(5)		Mohammad Vali Khan Khalatbari Tonekaboni محمدولی‌خان خلعتبری تنکابنی (1848–1926)	12 March 1911	26 July 1911	136 days	Moderate Socialists	—		Ahmad Shah Qajar (1909–1925)	
7		Najaf-Qoli Khan Bakhtiari نجف‌قلی‌خان بختیاری (1846–1930)	26 July 1911	1913	c. 2 years	Moderate Socialists	—		Ahmad Shah Qajar (1909–1925)	
8		Mohammad-Ali Ala ol-Saltaneh محمدعلی علاءالسلطنه (1829–1918)	18 January 1913	16 August 1913	210 days	Independent	—		Ahmad Shah Qajar (1909–1925)	
(6)		Mostowfi ol-Mamalek مستوفی‌الممالک (1875–1932)	17 August 1913	14 March 1915	1 year, 209 days	Democrats	—		Ahmad Shah Qajar (1909–1925)	
(6)		Mostowfi ol-Mamalek مستوفی‌الممالک (1875–1932)	17 August 1913	14 March 1915	1 year, 209 days	Democrats	1914		Ahmad Shah Qajar (1909–1925)	
9		Hassan Pirnia حسن پیرنیا (1871–1935)	14 March 1915	1 May 1915	48 days	Moderate Socialists	—		Ahmad Shah Qajar (1909–1925)	
10		Abdol Majid Mirza عبدالمجید میرزا (1845–1927)	1 May 1915	18 August 1915	109 days	Independent	—		Ahmad Shah Qajar (1909–1925)	
(6)		Mostowfi ol-Mamalek مستوفی‌الممالک (1875–1932)	18 August 1915	24 December 1915	128 days	Democrats	—		Ahmad Shah Qajar (1909–1925)	
11		Abdol-Hossein Mirza Farman Farma عبدالحسين ميرزا فرمانفرما (1857–1939)	24 December 1915	29 February 1916	67 days	Moderate Socialists	—		Ahmad Shah Qajar (1909–1925)	
(5)		Mohammad Vali Khan Khalatbari Tonekaboni محمدولی‌خان خلعتبری تنکابنی (1848–1926)	5 March 1916	29 August 1916	177 days	Moderate Socialists	—		Ahmad Shah Qajar (1909–1925)	
12		Vosugh od-Dowleh حسن وثوق‌الدوله (1873–1950)	29 August 1916	5 June 1917	280 days	Democrats	—		Ahmad Shah Qajar (1909–1925)	
(8)		Mohammad-Ali Ala ol-Saltaneh محمدعلی علاءالسلطنه (1829–1918)	5 June 1917	21 November 1917	169 days	Independent	—		Ahmad Shah Qajar (1909–1925)	
(10)		Abdol Majid Mirza عبدالمجید میرزا (1845–1927)	21 November 1917	16 January 1918	56 days	Independent	—		Ahmad Shah Qajar (1909–1925)	
(6)		Mostowfi ol-Mamalek مستوفی‌الممالک (1875–1932)	16 January 1918	1 May 1918	105 days	Democrats	—		Ahmad Shah Qajar (1909–1925)	
(7)		Najaf-Qoli Khan Bakhtiari نجف‌قلی‌خان بختیاری (1846–1930)	1 May 1918	8 August 1918	99 days	Moderate Socialists	—		Ahmad Shah Qajar (1909–1925)	
(12)		Vosugh od-Dowleh حسن وثوق‌الدوله (1873–1950)	8 August 1918	3 July 1920	1 year, 330 days	Democrats (until 1919)	—		Ahmad Shah Qajar (1909–1925)	
(12)		Vosugh od-Dowleh حسن وثوق‌الدوله (1873–1950)	8 August 1918	3 July 1920	1 year, 330 days	Independent	—		Ahmad Shah Qajar (1909–1925)	
(9)		Hassan Pirnia حسن پیرنیا (1871–1935)	3 July 1920	27 October 1920	116 days	Independent	—		Ahmad Shah Qajar (1909–1925)	
13		Fathollah Khan Akbar فتح الله خان اکبر (1878–1967)	27 October 1920	22 February 1921 (deposed)	118 days	Independent	—		Ahmad Shah Qajar (1909–1925)	
14		Zia ol Din Tabatabaee ضیاء الدین طباطبایی (1889–1969)	24 February 1921	4 June 1921	100 days	Independent	1921		Ahmad Shah Qajar (1909–1925)	
15		Qavām os-Saltaneh قوام السلطنه (1873–1955)	4 June 1921	21 January 1922	231 days	Reformers' Party	—		Ahmad Shah Qajar (1909–1925)	
(9)		Hassan Pirnia حسن پیرنیا (1871–1935)	21 January 1922	22 June 1922	152 days	Independent	—		Ahmad Shah Qajar (1909–1925)	
(15)		Qavām os-Saltaneh قوام السلطنه (1873–1955)	22 June 1922	15 February 1923	238 days	Reformers' Party	—		Ahmad Shah Qajar (1909–1925)	
(6)		Mostowfi ol-Mamalek مستوفی‌الممالک (1875–1932)	15 February 1923	15 June 1923	120 days	Revival Party	—		Ahmad Shah Qajar (1909–1925)	
(9)		Hassan Pirnia حسن پیرنیا (1871–1935)	15 June 1923	26 October 1923	133 days	Independent	—		Ahmad Shah Qajar (1909–1925)	
16		Reza Khan Sardar Sepah رضاخان سردار سپه (1878–1944)	26 October 1923	12 December 1925 (became Shah)	2 years, 47 days	Military	—		Ahmad Shah Qajar (1909–1925)	
16		Reza Khan Sardar Sepah رضاخان سردار سپه (1878–1944)	26 October 1923	12 December 1925 (became Shah)	2 years, 47 days	Military	1923		Ahmad Shah Qajar (1909–1925)	
• Imperial State of Iran (1925–1979) •
—		Mohammad Ali Foroughi محمدعلی فروغی (1875–1942) acting	12 December 1925	13 June 1926	183 days	Revival Party	—		Reza Shah Pahlavi (1925–1941)	
(6)		Mostowfi ol-Mamalek مستوفی‌الممالک (1875–1932)	13 June 1926	2 June 1927	354 days	Revival Party	1926		Reza Shah Pahlavi (1925–1941)	
17		Mehdi Hedayat مهدی قلی هدایت (1864–1955)	2 June 1927	18 September 1933	6 years, 108 days	Revival Party (until 1930)	—		Reza Shah Pahlavi (1925–1941)	
17		Mehdi Hedayat مهدی قلی هدایت (1864–1955)	2 June 1927	18 September 1933	6 years, 108 days	Revival Party (until 1930)	1928		Reza Shah Pahlavi (1925–1941)	
17		Mehdi Hedayat مهدی قلی هدایت (1864–1955)	2 June 1927	18 September 1933	6 years, 108 days	Independent	1930		Reza Shah Pahlavi (1925–1941)	
17		Mehdi Hedayat مهدی قلی هدایت (1864–1955)	2 June 1927	18 September 1933	6 years, 108 days	Independent	1932		Reza Shah Pahlavi (1925–1941)	
18		Mohammad Ali Foroughi محمدعلی فروغی (1875–1942)	18 September 1933	3 December 1935	2 years, 76 days	Independent	—		Reza Shah Pahlavi (1925–1941)	
19		Mahmoud Djam محمود جم (1880–1969)	3 December 1935	26 October 1939	3 years, 327 days	Independent	—		Reza Shah Pahlavi (1925–1941)	
20		Ahmad Matin-Daftari احمد متین دفتری (1897–1971)	26 October 1939	26 June 1940	244 days	Independent	1939		Reza Shah Pahlavi (1925–1941)	
21		Ali Mansur علی خان منصور (1886–1974)	26 June 1940	27 August 1941 (resigned)	1 year, 62 days	Independent	—		Reza Shah Pahlavi (1925–1941)	
(18)		Mohammad Ali Foroughi محمدعلی فروغی (1875–1942)	27 August 1941	9 March 1942	194 days	Independent	—		Mohammad Reza Pahlavi (1941–1979)	
22		Ali Soheili علی سهیلی (1896–1958)	9 March 1942	9 August 1942	153 days	Independent	—		Mohammad Reza Pahlavi (1941–1979)	
(15)		Ahmad Qavam احمد قوام (1873–1955)	9 August 1942	15 February 1943	190 days	Independent	—		Mohammad Reza Pahlavi (1941–1979)	
(22)		Ali Soheili علی سهیلی (1896–1958)	15 February 1943	6 April 1944	1 year, 51 days	Independent	—		Mohammad Reza Pahlavi (1941–1979)	
23		Mohammad Sa'ed محمد ساعد مراغه‌ای (1881–1973)	6 April 1944	25 November 1944	233 days	Independent	1943		Mohammad Reza Pahlavi (1941–1979)	
24		Morteza-Qoli Bayat مرتضی‌قلی بیات (1890–1958)	25 November 1944	13 May 1945	169 days	Independent	—		Mohammad Reza Pahlavi (1941–1979)	
25		Ebrahim Hakimi ابراهیم حکیمی (1871–1959)	13 May 1945	6 June 1945	24 days	Independent	—		Mohammad Reza Pahlavi (1941–1979)	
26		Mohsen Sadr محسن صدر (1871–1962)	6 June 1945	30 October 1945	146 days	Independent	—		Mohammad Reza Pahlavi (1941–1979)	
(25)		Ebrahim Hakimi ابراهیم حکیمی (1871–1959)	30 October 1945	28 January 1946	90 days	Independent	—		Mohammad Reza Pahlavi (1941–1979)	
(15)		Ahmad Qavam احمد قوام (1873–1955)	28 January 1946	18 December 1947	1 year, 324 days	Independent	—	Qavam I	Mohammad Reza Pahlavi (1941–1979)	
(15)		Ahmad Qavam احمد قوام (1873–1955)	28 January 1946	18 December 1947	1 year, 324 days	Democrat Party (from 29 June 1946)	1947	Qavam II	Mohammad Reza Pahlavi (1941–1979)	
(25)		Ebrahim Hakimi ابراهیم حکیمی (1871–1959)	29 December 1947	13 June 1948	167 days	Independent	—		Mohammad Reza Pahlavi (1941–1979)	
27		Abdolhossein Hazhir عبدالحسین هژیر (1902–1949)	13 June 1948	9 November 1948	149 days	Independent	—	Hazhir	Mohammad Reza Pahlavi (1941–1979)	
(23)		Mohammad Sa'ed محمد ساعد مراغه‌ای (1881–1973)	9 November 1948	23 March 1950	1 year, 134 days	Independent	—		Mohammad Reza Pahlavi (1941–1979)	
(21)		Ali Mansur علی خان منصور (1886–1974)	23 March 1950	26 June 1950	95 days	Independent	1950		Mohammad Reza Pahlavi (1941–1979)	
28		Ali Razmara حاجیعلی رزم‌آرا (1901–1951)	26 June 1950	7 March 1951 X	254 days	Military	—	Razmara	Mohammad Reza Pahlavi (1941–1979)	
—		Khalil Fahimi خلیل فهیمی (1876–1953) acting	7 March 1951	12 March 1951	5 days	Independent	—		Mohammad Reza Pahlavi (1941–1979)	
29		Hossein Ala' حسین علاء (1882–1964)	12 March 1951	27 April 1951	46 days	Independent	—	Ala' I	Mohammad Reza Pahlavi (1941–1979)	
30		Mohammad Mosaddegh محمد مصدق (1882–1967)	28 April 1951	17 July 1952	1 year, 80 days	National Front	—	Mosaddegh I	Mohammad Reza Pahlavi (1941–1979)	
(15)		Ahmad Qavam احمد قوام (1873–1955)	17 July 1952	22 July 1952	5 days	Independent	—		Mohammad Reza Pahlavi (1941–1979)	
(30)		Mohammad Mosaddegh محمد مصدق (1882–1967)	22 July 1952	19 August 1953 (deposed)	1 year, 28 days	National Front	—	Mosaddegh II	Mohammad Reza Pahlavi (1941–1979)	
31		Fazlollah Zahedi فضل‌الله زاهدی (1897–1963)	19 August 1953	7 April 1955	1 year, 231 days	Military	—		Mohammad Reza Pahlavi (1941–1979)	
31		Fazlollah Zahedi فضل‌الله زاهدی (1897–1963)	19 August 1953	7 April 1955	1 year, 231 days	Military	1954		Mohammad Reza Pahlavi (1941–1979)	
(29)		Hossein Ala' حسین علاء (1882–1964)	7 April 1955	3 April 1957	1 year, 361 days	Independent	—		Mohammad Reza Pahlavi (1941–1979)	
(29)		Hossein Ala' حسین علاء (1882–1964)	7 April 1955	3 April 1957	1 year, 361 days	Independent	1956		Mohammad Reza Pahlavi (1941–1979)	
32		Manouchehr Eghbal منوچهر اقبال (1909–1977)	3 April 1957	31 August 1960	3 years, 150 days	Nationalists' Party	—	Eghbal	Mohammad Reza Pahlavi (1941–1979)	
33		Jafar Sharif-Emami جعفر شریف‌امامی (1910–1998)	31 August 1960	5 May 1961	247 days	Nationalists' Party	1960		Mohammad Reza Pahlavi (1941–1979)	
34		Ali Amini علی امینی (1905–1992)	5 May 1961	19 July 1962	1 year, 75 days	Independent	1961	Amini	Mohammad Reza Pahlavi (1941–1979)	
35		Asadollah Alam اسدالله علم (1919–1978)	19 July 1962	7 March 1964	1 year, 232 days	People's Party	—	Alam I	Mohammad Reza Pahlavi (1941–1979)	
35		Asadollah Alam اسدالله علم (1919–1978)	19 July 1962	7 March 1964	1 year, 232 days	People's Party	—	Alam II	Mohammad Reza Pahlavi (1941–1979)	
36		Hassan Ali Mansur حسنعلی منصور (1923–1965)	7 March 1964	26 January 1965 X	325 days	New Iran Party	1963	Mansur	Mohammad Reza Pahlavi (1941–1979)	
37		Amir-Abbas Hoveyda امیرعباس هویدا (1919–1979)	26 January 1965	7 August 1977	12 years, 193 days	New Iran Party (until 1975)	—	Hoveyda I	Mohammad Reza Pahlavi (1941–1979)	
37		Amir-Abbas Hoveyda امیرعباس هویدا (1919–1979)	26 January 1965	7 August 1977	12 years, 193 days	New Iran Party (until 1975)	1967	Hoveyda II	Mohammad Reza Pahlavi (1941–1979)	
37		Amir-Abbas Hoveyda امیرعباس هویدا (1919–1979)	26 January 1965	7 August 1977	12 years, 193 days	New Iran Party (until 1975)	—	Hoveyda III	Mohammad Reza Pahlavi (1941–1979)	
37		Amir-Abbas Hoveyda امیرعباس هویدا (1919–1979)	26 January 1965	7 August 1977	12 years, 193 days	New Iran Party (until 1975)	1971	Hoveyda IV	Mohammad Reza Pahlavi (1941–1979)	
37		Amir-Abbas Hoveyda امیرعباس هویدا (1919–1979)	26 January 1965	7 August 1977	12 years, 193 days	New Iran Party (until 1975)	—	Hoveyda V	Mohammad Reza Pahlavi (1941–1979)	
37		Amir-Abbas Hoveyda امیرعباس هویدا (1919–1979)	26 January 1965	7 August 1977	12 years, 193 days	New Iran Party (until 1975)	—	Hoveyda VI	Mohammad Reza Pahlavi (1941–1979)	
37		Amir-Abbas Hoveyda امیرعباس هویدا (1919–1979)	26 January 1965	7 August 1977	12 years, 193 days	Rastakhiz Party	1975	Hoveyda VI	Mohammad Reza Pahlavi (1941–1979)	
38		Jamshid Amouzegar جمشید آموزگار (1923–2016)	7 August 1977	27 August 1978	1 year, 20 days	Rastakhiz Party	—	Amouzegar	Mohammad Reza Pahlavi (1941–1979)	
(33)		Jafar Sharif-Emami جعفر شریف‌امامی (1910–1998)	27 August 1978	6 November 1978	71 days	Rastakhiz Party (until 1 November)	—	Sharif-Emami II	Mohammad Reza Pahlavi (1941–1979)	
(33)		Jafar Sharif-Emami جعفر شریف‌امامی (1910–1998)	27 August 1978	6 November 1978	71 days	Independent	—	Sharif-Emami II	Mohammad Reza Pahlavi (1941–1979)	
39		Gholam Reza Azhari غلامرضا ازهاری (1912–2001)	6 November 1978	4 January 1979	59 days	Military	—	Azhari	Mohammad Reza Pahlavi (1941–1979)	
40		Shapour Bakhtiar شاپور بختیار (1914–1991)	4 January 1979	11 February 1979 (deposed)	38 days	National Front (expelled)	—	Bakhtiar	Mohammad Reza Pahlavi (1941–1979)	
• Islamic Republic of Iran (1979–present) •
41		Mehdi Bazargan مهدی بازرگان (1907–1995)	4 February 1979	6 November 1979 (cabinet resigned)	275 days	Freedom Movement	—	Interim	Ruhollah Khomeini (1979–1989)	
Council of the Islamic Revolution دولت موقت شورای انقلاب اسلامی			6 November 1979	12 August 1980	280 days	—	—	Interim	Ruhollah Khomeini (1979–1989)	
42		Mohammad-Ali Rajai محمدعلی رجائی (1933–1981)	12 August 1980	4 August 1981	357 days	Islamic Association of Teachers of Iran	1980	Rajai	Ruhollah Khomeini (1979–1989)	
43		Mohammad-Javad Bahonar محمدجواد باهنر (1933–1981)	4 August 1981	30 August 1981 X	26 days	Islamic Republican Party	—	Bahonar	Ruhollah Khomeini (1979–1989)	
44		Mohammad-Reza Mahdavi Kani محمدرضا مهدوی کنی (1931–2014)	2 September 1981	31 October 1981	59 days	Combatant Clergy Association	—	Interim	Ruhollah Khomeini (1979–1989)	
45		Mir-Hossein Mousavi میرحسین موسوی خامنه (born 1942)	31 October 1981	16 August 1989	7 years, 289 days	Islamic Republican Party (until 1987)	—	Mousavi I	Ruhollah Khomeini (1979–1989)	
45		Mir-Hossein Mousavi میرحسین موسوی خامنه (born 1942)	31 October 1981	16 August 1989	7 years, 289 days	Islamic Republican Party (until 1987)	1984	Mousavi II	Ruhollah Khomeini (1979–1989)	
45		Mir-Hossein Mousavi میرحسین موسوی خامنه (born 1942)	31 October 1981	16 August 1989	7 years, 289 days	Independent	1984	Mousavi II	Ruhollah Khomeini (1979–1989)	
Post abolished (16 August 1989 – present)

== See also ==
- List of monarchs of Iran
- President of Iran
  - List of presidents of Iran
- List of vice presidents of Iran
- List of speakers of the Parliament of Iran

== Sources ==
- Dowlathā-ye Īrān : az Mīrzā Naṣr Allāh Khān Moshīr al-Dowleh tā Mīr Ḥuseyn Mūsavī : aʻz̤ā-ye kābīnehā, sharḥ-e ḥāl, ʻaks, nemūne-ye emz̤āʼ va dastkhaṭṭ-e nakhostvazīrān, vazīrān va moʻāvenīn-e nakhostvazīr : bar asās-e daftar-e s̲abt-e kābīnehā-ye nakhostvazīrī [The governments of Iran : From Mīrzā Naṣr Allāh Khān Moshīr al-Dowleh to Mīr Ḥuseyn Mūsavī : Members of cabinets, biographies, photos, signature samples and handwriting exemplars of prime ministers, ministers and deputy prime ministers : On the basis of the prime minister's office records] (in Persian). Tehrān: Sāzmān-e Chāp va Enteshārāt, Vezārat-e Farhang va Ershād-e Eslāmī. 1999. ISBN 978-964-422-147-7.
- Sepehr, Ahmad-Ali (1983–84). Iran dar jang-e bozorg (1914–1918) [Iran in the Great War (1914–1918)] (in Persian). Tehrān: Adib.
- Ettehadieh, Mansoureh (2011). "CONSTITUTIONAL REVOLUTION v. Political parties of the constitutional period". Encyclopaedia Iranica, Vol. VI, Fasc. 2. pp. 199–202.
- Calmard, J. (2011). "ATĀBAK-E AʿẒAM, AMĪN-AL-SOLṬĀN". Encyclopaedia Iranica, Vol. II, Fasc. 8. pp. 878–890.
- Mir, Cyrus (1999). "FARMĀNFARMĀ, ʿABD-AL-ḤOSAYN MĪRZĀ". Encyclopaedia Iranica. However, the birth year indicated there (1858) does not agree with his WorldCat entry and with his VIAF entry, both of which give 1857.
