= National Consultative Assembly =

National legislative body of Iran from 1906 to 1979

Coordinates: 35.6903°N 51.4333°E

National Consultative Assembly مجلس شورای ملی Majles-e Showrā-ye Mellī
- 1906–1979

Type
- Type: Unicameral (1906−1949); Lower house (1949−1979)

History
- Founded: November 6, 1906
- Disbanded: February 11, 1979
- Succeeded by: Islamic Consultative Assembly

Structure
- Seats: 268 (At peak)
- Length of term: 2 years (1906−1956); 4 years (1956−1979)

Elections
- Last election: 20 June 1975

Meeting place
- Baharestan Palace

Constitution
- Persian Constitution of 1906

The National Consultative Assembly (Persian: مجلس شورای ملی, romanized: Majles-e showrā-ye mellī), or simply Majles, was the national legislative body of Qajar and Pahlavi Iran from 1906 to 1979. It was established by the Persian Constitution of 1906. Although the 1906 Constitution established a bicameral legislature, the Majles remained the only (unicameral) legislative chamber until the 1949 Constituent Assembly, in which the Senate of Iran was formed as the upper house, making the Majles the lower house.

It was elected by universal suffrage, excluding the armed forces and convicted criminals but after 1963 including women, who could both vote and be elected.

After the Iranian Revolution of 1979, which formed the Islamic Republic of Iran, the Majles was succeeded by the Islamic Consultative Assembly, and the Senate of Iran was abolished, making it once again a unicameral legislature.

== Historical composition ==
=== Qajar Iran ===
U&P / Soc. / Soc. Dem. / Dem. / Soc. Prog. / Mod. Soc. / Revival / LC / Ref. / Indep. / Others		Total; Seats
1906	21 / 35 / 100	156
1909	4 / 28 / 3 / 36 / 55	126
1914	31 / 29 / 14 / 41	115
1921	18 / 35 / 85	138
1923	14 / 40 / 8 / 76	138

=== Pahlavi Iran ===
==== Reza Shah ====
Progress Party / Independent		Total; Seats
1926	136	136
1928	122 / 14	136
1930	136	136
1932	136	136
1935	136	136
1937	136	136
1939	136	136
1941	136	136

==== Mohammad Reza Pahlavi ====
Tudeh / Iran / Nat. Front / Justice / Democrat / Nat. Union / Nat. Will / Indep. / Others		Total; Seats
1943–44	8 / 6 / 15 / 30 / 26 / 36 / 15	136
1947	25 / 73 / 36 / 2	136
1950	10 / 126	136
1952	30 / 49	79

People's / Nationalist's / Iran Novin / Rastakhiz / Pan-Iranist / Indep. / Others		Total; Seats
1954	136	136
1956	36 / 71 / 20 / 9	136
1960	50 / 104 / 46	200
1961	65 / 75 / 32 / 28	200
1963	16 / 140 / 44	200
1967	31 / 180 / 5 / 3	219
1971	37 / 230 / 1	268
1975	268	268

== Notes and references ==
- Afary, Janet. The Iranian Constitutional Revolution, 1906-1911. Columbia University Press. 1996. ISBN 0-231-10351-4
