= 3rd Iranian Majlis =

3rd term of the Iranian Majlis

3rd National Consultative Assembly
←	2nd	4th	→

Overview
- Jurisdiction: Sublime State of Persia
- Meeting place: Baharestan
- Term: 6 December 1914 – 13 November 1915
- Election: 1914

National Consultative Assembly
- Members: 115
- Speaker: Hassan Pirnia
- 1st Deputy: Nasrollah Taghavi (1st session); Soleiman Eskandari (2nd session); Hossein Adl (3rd session)
- 2nd Deputy: Mohammad-Ali Foroughi (1st session); Esmaeil Marzban (2nd session); Mohammad-Sadegh Tabatabaei (3rd session)

Sessions
- 1st: 10 January 1915 – 3 April 1915
- 2nd: 4 April 1915 – 6 October 1915
- 3rd: 7 October 1915 – 3 November 1915

3rd Iranian Majlis was commenced on 6 December 1914 and ended on 13 November 1915.

== Fraction members ==
Neutrality was in coalition with the Moderates.

Month	Democrat	Moderate	Learned Council	Neutrality	Total
Safar	13	12	10	10	45
Rabi' al-Awwal	13	▲14	10	10	47
Rabi' al-Thani	▲14	▲17	10	▲13	54
Jumada al-awwal	▲15	▲18	▲13	13	59
Jumada al-Thani	▲21	▲19	13	13	66
Rajab	21	19	13	13	66
Sha'ban	▲25	19	▲15	13	72
Ramadhan	▲28	▲21	▲16	▲14	79
Shawwal	28	▲22	▲17	▲15	82
Dhu al-Qidah	▲29	22	17	15	83
Dhul-Hijjah	▲32	22	17	15	86
Source: Majlis Research Center
