= 2nd Iranian Majlis =

2nd term of the Iranian Majlis

2nd National Consultative Assembly
←	1st	3rd	→

Overview
- Jurisdiction: Sublime State of Persia
- Meeting place: Baharestan
- Term: November 15, 1909 – December 25, 1911
- Election: 1909

National Consultative Assembly
- Members: 126
- Speaker: Mirza Sadeq Khan (1st, 2nd sessions); Mohammad-Ali Foroughi (3rd, 4th sessions); Esmail Momtaz (4th session); Hossein Pirnia (4th session)

The 2nd Iranian Majlis was initiated on 15 November 1909 and ended on 25 December 1911. It was elected under a new electoral law calling for a single class of voters, and initiated what resembled political parties (The Moderates, led by Behbahani, and the Democratic Party, led by Taqizadeh).

It moved in the same direction as its predecessor (a reformist and nationalist parliament). It attempted to reorganize the state bureaucracy, enact some reforms on education, health and tax collection system as well. When it rejected an ultimatum from the Russian Empire, it too was dissolved in December 1911.
