= 1925 Persian Constituent Assembly election =

Constituent Assembly elections were held in Persia in 1925. The elections were mandated by the Parliament of Iran on 31 October 1925.

According to Homa Katouzian, though the elections "had been manipulated", the assembly was represented by "commanding heights of the society, including many khans and provincial magnets, some prominent religious leaders, former leaders and figures of the Constitutional Revolution".

Ervand Abrahamian says Prime Minister Reza Khan used war and interior ministries to fill the assembly with his supporters from the Revival Party, as well as those of the Reformers' Party. Out of 260 seats in the assembly, only three Socialist Party members led by Soleiman Eskandari formed the minority.

The Assembly convened on 6 December.
