= 1923 Persian legislative election =

- 1923

All 138 seats to the National Consultative Assembly
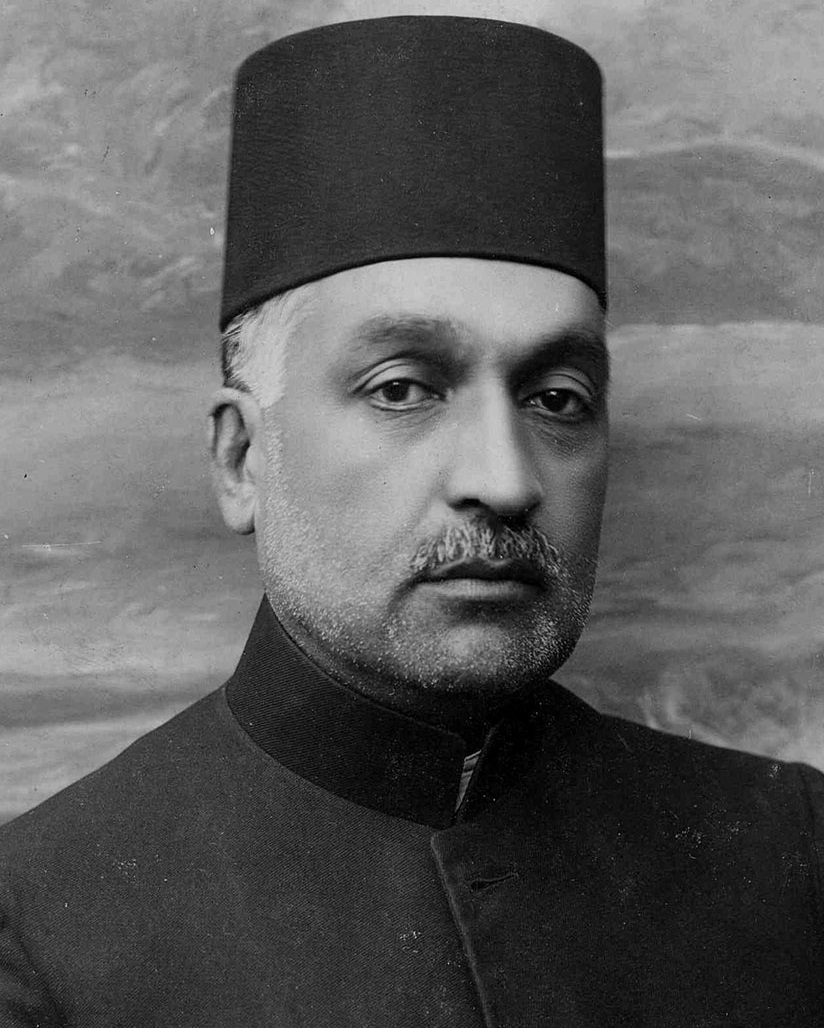

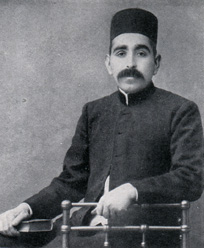

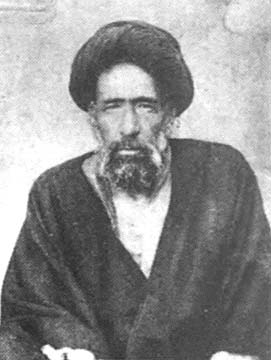
	First party	Second party
Leader	Mohammad Tadayon	Soleiman Eskandari
Party	Revival Party	Socialist Party
Leader's seat	Birjand	Tehran
Seats won	40	14
	Third party	Fourth party
Leader	Hassan Modarres
Party	Reformers' Party	Independent
Leader's seat	Tehran
Seats won	8	76
Prime Minister before election
Reza Khan
Elected Prime Minister
Reza Khan

The Persian legislative election of 1923 was held in November 1923 after the appointment of Reza Pahlavi as prime minister by Ahmad Shah Qajar. It was the last election in the Qajar dynasty. Parliament opened on 11 February 1924.

During the elections, Reza Khan used the military to manipulate the elections in many tribal constituencies and gave allied Revival Party and Socialist Party majority. Only elections in Tehran was not manipulated.
