= Mohammad-Ali Angaji =

Iranian Ayatollah and politician (1897-1983)

Member of Assembly of Experts for Constitution
- In office 15 August 1979 – 15 November 1979
- Constituency: East Azerbaijan Province
- Majority: 580,854 (64.5%)

Member of Parliament of Iran
- In office 27 April 1952 – 16 August 1953
- Constituency: Tabriz

Personal details
- Born: Seyyed Mirza Mohammad-Ali Angaji; 1897 Tabriz, Persia
- Died: 5 June 1983 (aged 85–86) Tabriz, Iran
- Resting place: Fatima Masumeh Shrine, Qom
- Party: National Front
- Other political affiliations: Muslim People's Republic Party (1979)

Mohammad-Ali Angaji (Persian: محمدعلی انگجی) was an Iranian Shia cleric and politician. A loyal National Front member, he served as a member of parliament during the 17th term and ran for the 1954 election in Tehran. He was elected to the 73-seats Assembly of Experts for Constitution in 1979.
