= 1921 Persian legislative election =

- 1921

All 138 seats to the National Consultative Assembly
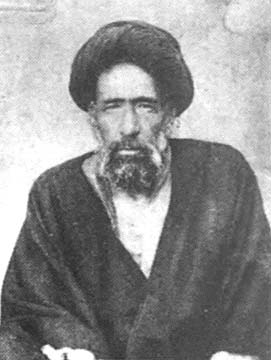

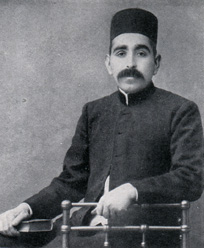
	Majority party	Minority party	Third party
Leader	Hassan Modarres	Soleiman Eskandari
Party	Reformers' Party	Socialist Party	Independent
Leader's seat	Tehran	Tehran
Seats won	35	18	85
Prime Minister before election
Zia'eddin Tabatabaee
Elected Prime Minister
Ahmad Qavam

The Persian legislative election of 1921 was the first election held after the 1921 Persian coup d'état. Reformers' Party, led by Hassan Modarres was the majority party while Socialist Party was the main opposition.
