= Pahlavi Iran =

Iran under the Pahlavi dynasty from 1925 to 1979

Imperial State of Iran^{a} دولت شاهنشاهی ایران Dovlat-e Šâhanšâhi-ye Irân
- 1925–1979
- Flag (one of several designs in use from 1972–1979) Emblem (1972–1979)
- Motto: مرا داد فرمود و خود داور است; Marâ dâd farmud o xod dâvar ast "Justice He bids me do, as He will judge me"
- Anthem: سلامتی دولت علیهٔ ایران; Salâmati-ye Dowlat-e 'Aliyeye Irân "Salute of the Sublime State of Iran" (1925–1933) سرود شاهنشاهی ایران; Sorud-e Šâhanšâhi-ye Irân "Imperial Anthem of Iran" (1933–1979)
- Coat of arms

- Capital and largest city: Tehran; 35°41′N 51°25′E
- Official languages: Persian
- Religion: Shia Islam (Note: Twelver Shi'ism was practiced by the majority of the population and remained the official state religion under the 1906 Persian Constitution. Nevertheless, the Pahlavi governments pursued an extensive program of secularization that significantly curtailed clerical influence over state institutions, education, the legal system, and public life.) (Note: Minority religions: Sunni Islam, Christianity, Zoroastrianism, Judaism, Baháʼí Faith, Mandaeism)
- Demonyms: Iranian; Persian
- Government: Unitary semi-constitutional monarchy: under one-party system (1975–1978)
- Shah
  - 1925–1941: Reza Shah
  - 1941–1979: Mohammad Reza Pahlavi
- Prime Minister
  - 1925–1926 (first): Mohammad Ali Foroughi
  - 1979 (last): Shapour Bakhtiar
- Legislature: Majles
  - Upper house: Senate (after 1950)
  - Lower house: National Assembly
- Historical era: Interwar period · World War II · Cold War
  - Founded: 15 December 1925
  - Anglo-Soviet occupation of Iran: 1941–1946
  - Constitutional amendment: 8 May 1949
  - Coup d'etat: 19 August 1953
  - Social reforms: 1963–1978
  - Iranian Revolution: 1978–1979
  - Monarchy abolished: 11 February 1979
  - Islamic Republic established: 1 April 1979

Area
  - Total: 1,648,195 km^{2} (636,372 sq mi)

Population
  - 1979 estimate: 38,424,952
  - 1976 census: 33,708,744
  - Density: 23/km^{2} (59.6/sq mi)
- GDP (PPP): 1978 estimate
  - Total: $614.16 billion
  - Per capita: $16,542
- GDP (nominal): 1978 estimate
  - Total: $77.99 billion
  - Per capita: $2,101
- Currency: Iranian rial (ریال) (IRR)
- Time zone: UTC+3:30 (IRST)
- Calling code: +98
- ISO 3166 code: IR
Preceded by	Succeeded by
Qajar Iran	Islamic Republic of Iran
- Today part of: Iran
- 1. From 1935. From 1925 to 1935, it was known officially as the Imperial State of Persia in the Western world.

The Imperial State of Iran, (Note: Persian: کشور شاهنشاهی ایران, romanized: Kešvar-e Šâhanšâhi-ye Irân) known in the Western world as the Imperial State of Persia until 1935 and commonly referred to as Pahlavi Iran, (Note: Persian: ایران پهلوی, romanized: Irân Pahlavi) was the Iranian state under the rule of the Pahlavi dynasty. It existed from the establishment of the dynasty in 1925 until its overthrow during the Islamic Revolution in 1979.

In February 1921, Reza Khan, a brigadier general in the Persian Cossack Brigade, led a coup d'état against the ruling Qajar government, becoming the commander-in-chief of the country's armed forces. On 12 December 1925, Iran's Majles, convened as a constituent assembly, deposed the Qajar dynasty and proclaimed Reza Khan, then serving as prime minister, shah, thereby establishing the Pahlavi dynasty. Under his rule, Iran became a centralized unitary state and underwent a series of modernization reforms, including infrastructure development, the expansion of education, and the secularization of state institutions. In 1935, Reza Shah requested that foreign governments refer to the country as "Iran" rather than "Persia" in official correspondence. Although Iran declared neutrality during World War II, it was invaded and occupied by British and Soviet forces in 1941, forcing Reza Shah to abdicate in favor of his son, Mohammad Reza Pahlavi.

Following World War II, Mohammad Reza Pahlavi faced the Iran crisis of 1946, which ended with the withdrawal of Soviet forces from Iranian territory. A constitutional amendment in 1949 granted the Shah the authority to dissolve the Majles and call new elections, strengthening the monarchy amid growing political instability. The rise of Prime Minister Mohammad Mosaddegh and the nationalization of the Iranian oil industry culminated in a constitutional crisis that forced the Shah into temporary exile in 1953. Following Mosaddegh's overthrow in the 1953 Iranian coup d'état, however, the Shah returned to Iran and further consolidated his rule. Supported by rising oil revenues and Western backing during the Cold War, he pursued an extensive military buildup and launched the White Revolution, a broad reform program that implemented sweeping land reform while expanding state investment in education, healthcare, infrastructure, and industrial development. Throughout the 1960s and 1970s, Iran experienced rapid economic growth, rising living standards, and extensive infrastructure development, thereby emerging as a major regional power.

Despite these gains, economic development remained uneven, with persistent wealth inequality and widening rural-to-urban disparities. Following a sharp decline in oil revenues in 1977, Iran's economy entered a period of slowdown characterized by rising inflation, unemployment, and declining investment. The economic downturn, combined with longstanding grievances over political repression, fueled mounting unrest that culminated in the Iranian Revolution, led by the exiled Shia cleric Ruhollah Khomeini. Following months of nationwide protests and strikes, the Shah and his family left Iran in January 1979, leading to the collapse of the imperial state and the establishment of an Islamic Republic.

== History ==
=== Origins ===
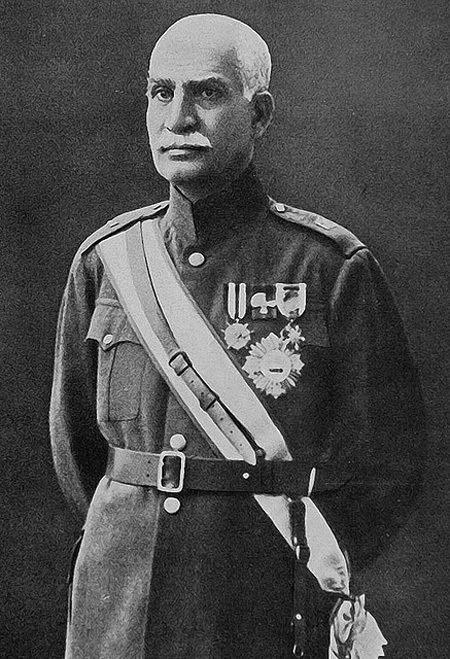
Reza Shah Pahlavi, founder of the Pahlavi dynasty, in 1940

During the late 19th and early 20th centuries, Iran faced financial difficulties under the weakened Qajar dynasty, stemming from limited industrialization and weak state infrastructure. To offset these problems, the Qajar government granted extensive commercial concessions to the neighboring British and Russian empires in exchange for loans and political support, but the move only contributed to further economic decline. Iranian dependence on the two empires intensified with the 1907 Anglo-Russian Convention, which formally divided Iran into British and Russian spheres of influence and significantly undermined the country's sovereignty.

Public dissatisfaction with foreign interference, bureaucratic mismanagement, and royal corruption contributed to the 1905–1911 Persian Constitutional Revolution, which established the first Iranian parliament and introduced a constitution limiting the powers of the monarchy. However, instability persisted due to continued British and Russian opposition to the constitutional movement, and conditions deteriorated further during the First World War, when Iran, despite declaring neutrality, became a battleground. The war disrupted economic production, devastated trade and agriculture, and contributed to widespread famine, severely weakening the authority of the central government.

In 1920, rumors of a Red Army-backed march on Tehran heightened fears of a potential Soviet takeover of Iran. Concerned by the growing instability, British officials sought the emergence of a strong central authority capable of restoring order to the country. In January 1921, British Army officer Edmund Ironside appointed Reza Khan, then a brigadier general of the Persian Cossack Brigade, to lead the entire force. A month later, Reza Khan led 3,000–4,000 Cossack troops into Tehran during the 1921 Persian coup d'état. Facing little resistance, he dissolved parliament and became Iran's commander-in-chief, subsequently launching military campaigns to suppress separatist movements in Tabriz, Gilan, Khorasan, Kurdistan, and Khuzestan.

=== Establishment and early years ===
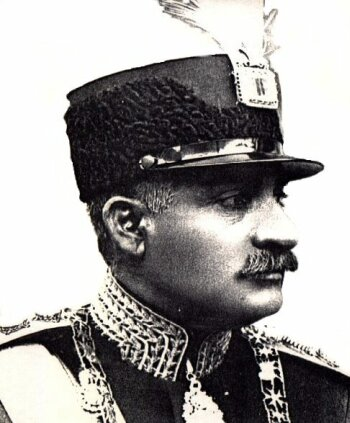
Reza Shah Pahlavi

In 1923, Reza Khan became the prime minister of Iran and subsequently pressured parliament into deposing the Qajar dynasty, paving the way for his accession to the throne. He had initially planned to declare Iran a republic, similar to the reforms implemented by Mustafa Kemal Atatürk in Turkey, but abandoned the proposal in the face of opposition from British leaders and the Shia clergy. Upon being sworn in as the monarch by a constituent assembly on 15 December 1925, Reza Shah adopted the dynastic name "Pahlavi", a reference to the Middle Persian language of the Sasanian Empire. He had previously chosen the surname for himself in November 1919 following the initial planning of Iran's surname law.

By the mid-1930s, Reza Shah's strong secular rule had the support of the middle and upper classes, but caused opposition among some groups, particularly the Shia clergy. In 1935, Reza Shah issued a decree asking foreign delegates to use the term Iran in formal correspondence, in accordance with the fact that "Persia" was a term used by Western people for the country called "Iran" in Persian. To avoid confusion with Iraq, the Iranian government later announced in 1959 that both "Persia" and "Iran" were acceptable in official use and could be used interchangeably.

==== World War II ====
Reza Shah preferred to obtain technical assistance from Germany, France, Italy, and other European countries. This created problems for Iran after 1939, when Germany and the United Kingdom became enemies during World War II. At the outbreak of the war, Reza Shah proclaimed Iran to be a neutral country, but Britain insisted that German engineers and technicians in Iran were spies with missions to sabotage British oil facilities in Khuzestan. The British embassy demanded that Iran expel all German citizens, but Reza Shah refused, claiming this would adversely affect his planned development projects.

In April 1941, war reached Iran's borders when Rashid Ali al-Gaylani, with assistance from Germany and Italy, launched the 1941 Iraqi coup d'état, sparking the Anglo-Iraqi War in May 1941. Germany and Italy quickly sent the pro-Axis forces in Iraq military aid. However, during the period from May to July 1941, the British and their allies defeated the pro-Axis forces in Iraq and later in Syria and Lebanon.

==== Allied occupation of Iran ====
In June 1941, Nazi Germany broke the Molotov–Ribbentrop Pact and invaded the Soviet Union, Iran's northern neighbor. The Soviets quickly allied themselves with the Allied countries, and during the summer of 1941, the British demanded that the Iranian government expel all Germans from Iran. Reza Shah refused to expel the Germans, and on 25 August the British and Soviets launched a surprise invasion; Reza Shah's government quickly surrendered after less than a week of fighting. The invasion's strategic purpose was to secure a supply line to the Soviet Union (later named the Persian Corridor), secure the oil fields and the Abadan Refinery (of the UK-owned Anglo-Iranian Oil Company), and limit German influence in Iran. As a result of the invasion, Reza Shah was forced to abdicate and was succeeded as Shah by Mohammad Reza Pahlavi, his 21-year-old son. Reza Shah passed away on 26 July 1944 while in exile in South Africa, at the age of 66.

During the remainder of World War II, Iran became a major conduit for British and American aid to the Soviet Union, as well as an escape for more than 120,000 Polish refugees and members of the Polish Armed Forces fleeing the Axis advance. At the 1943 Tehran Conference, the Allied "Big Three"—Joseph Stalin, Franklin D. Roosevelt, and Winston Churchill—issued the Tehran Declaration, reaffirming their commitment to preserving Iran's post-war independence and territorial integrity.

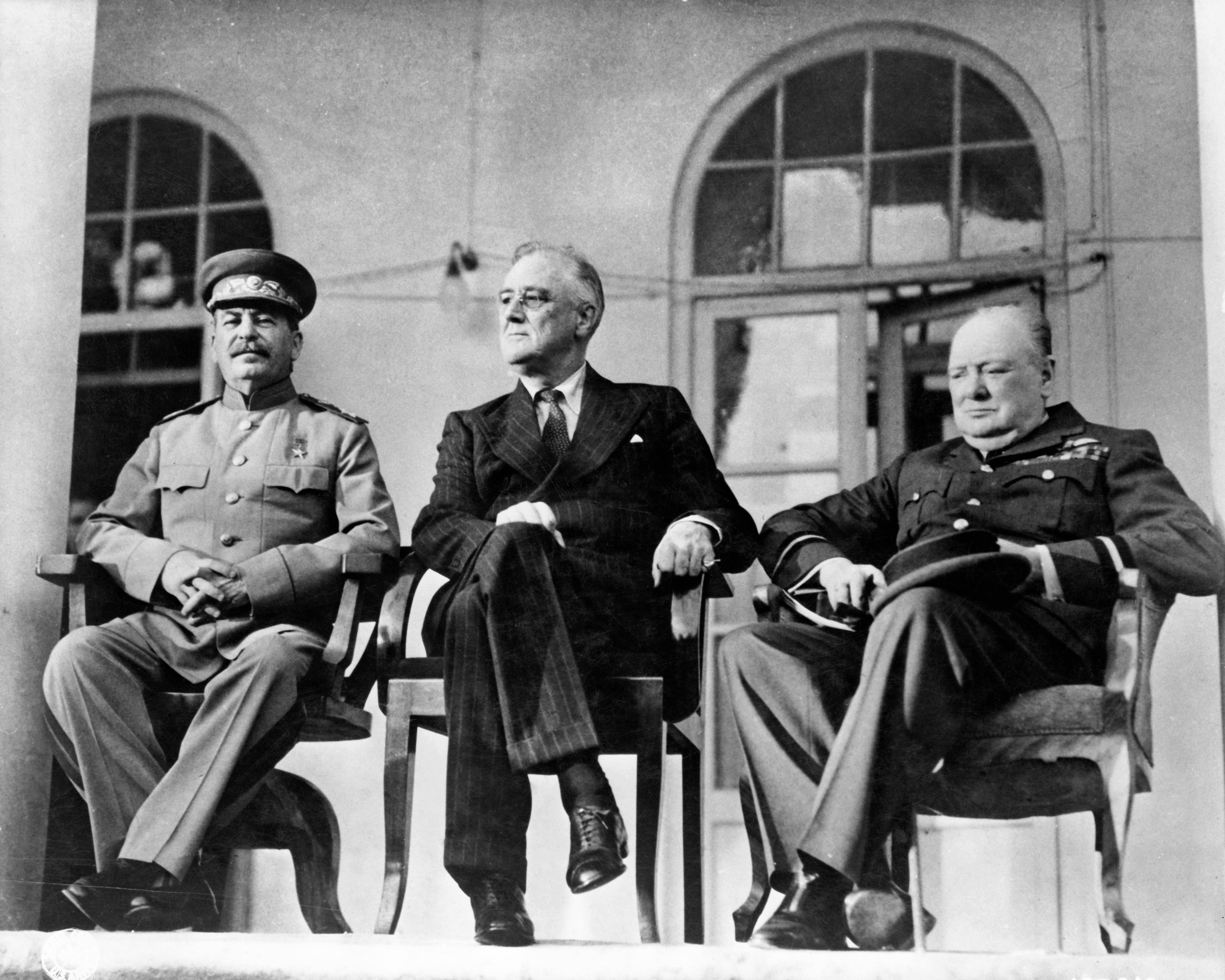
Tehran Declaration, Joseph Stalin, Franklin D. Roosevelt and Winston Churchill in Tehran, 1943

=== Post-war conflict and recovery ===
The Allied nations reassured the Iranian government that all foreign troops withdraw from the country by March 1946. Amid these assurances, the Tudeh Party of Iran, a communist party tied to the Soviet Union, became increasingly militant. In 1945, the Iranian government responded by deploying armed forces to restore order in the Tudeh-dominated northern regions. While the party's strongholds in Tehran and Isfahan were suppressed, Soviet troops stationed in Azerbaijan province prevented Iranian forces from entering the region. The ensuing dispute triggered the Iran crisis, one of the first major confrontations of the Cold War.

In a move directed by the Soviet Union, the Azerbaijan People's Government and the Republic of Mahabad were established in January 1946 as unrecognized secessionist states. However, following international pressure at the United Nations, as well as negotiations over oil concessions, Soviet forces withdrew from Iran in May 1946, allowing the Iranian Army to rapidly dismantle both separatist governments. With the support of the United States, the oil concessions granted to the Soviet Union were subsequently revoked by the Iranian government.

==== Constitutional changes ====
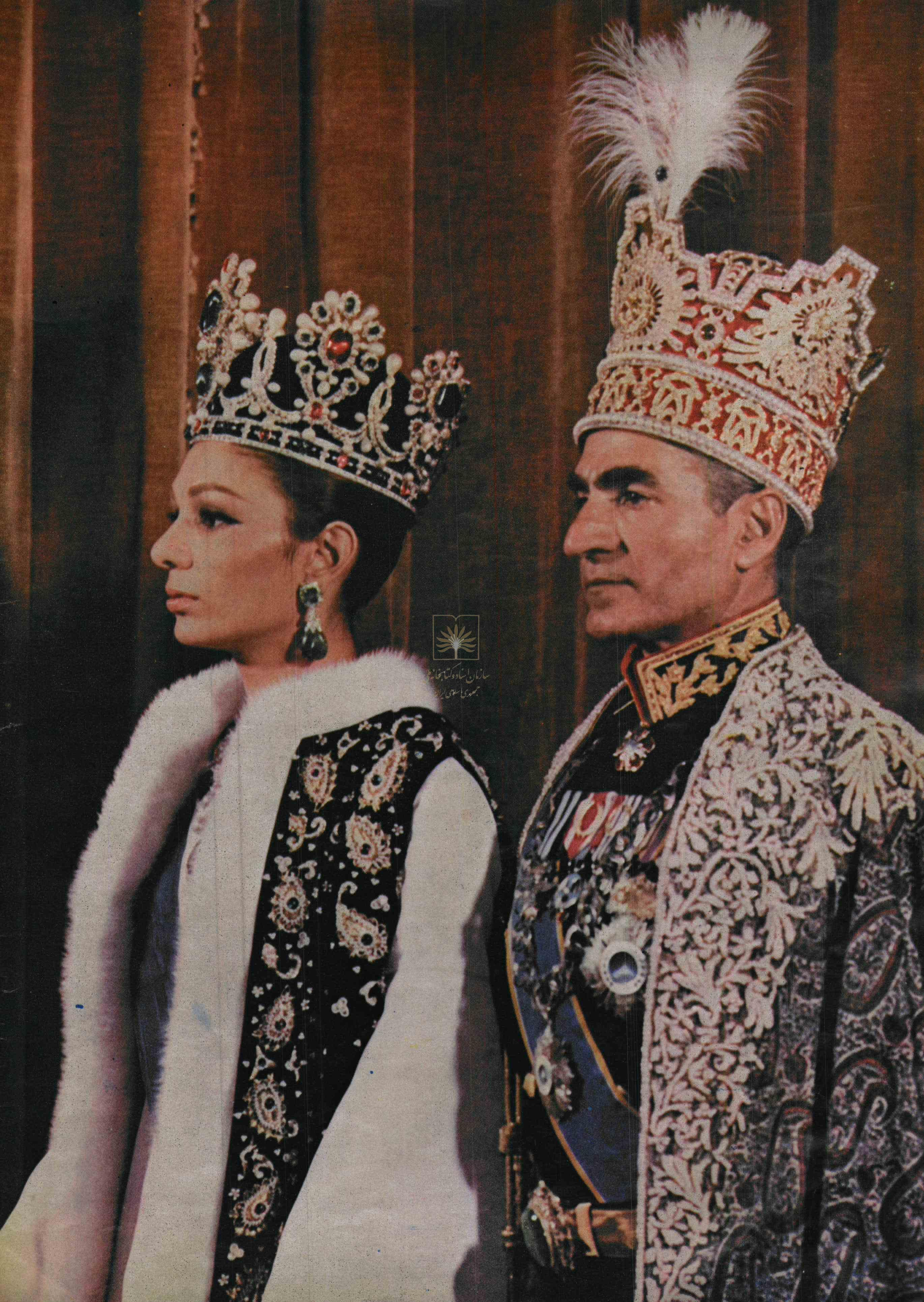
Mohammed Reza Pahlavi and his wife Farah Diba upon his 1967 coronation as the shah of Iran. His wife was crowned as shahbanu.

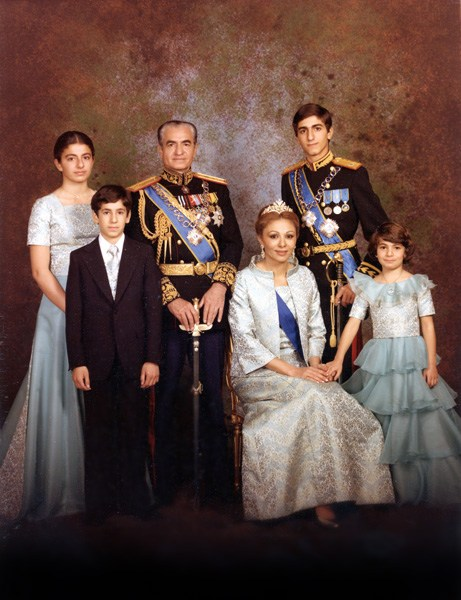
Official portrait of the Iranian royal family in 1978

Emerging victorious from crisis of 1946, Mohammad Reza Pahlavi began pushing constitutional changes to promote social reform and increase the power of the monarchy, though he was advised against this course of action by foreign diplomats, who considered it unwise to upset the separation of powers. On 4 February 1949, during a visit to the University of Tehran, an assailant opened fire on the Shah, wounding him with two bullets. That evening, the government declared martial law, and a special session of parliament imposed harsh measures against political enemies of the monarchy. The assailant was suspected of having links to the religious extremist group Fada'iyan-e Islam, which had previously carried out assassinations of secular political figures, as well as the Tudeh party. Both groups were subsequently outlawed, and their leaders arrested.

In an atmosphere of national support for the monarchy, parliament voted in favor of the Shah's bill calling for a constituent assembly to re-examine the constitution. To staff the assembly, the Shah selected individuals who were sympathetic to his aims. Mohammad-Sadegh Tabatabaei, a long-time ally of the Pahlavi dynasty, was appointed its leader. While the assembly was being organized, the Shah pushed through laws criminalizing newspaper criticism of the royal family, and transferring crown land holdings from general state ownership to his personal control. In March, he announced the convocation of the body and raised the question of convening a Senate for the first time, as permitted under the constitution but never previously implemented.

The constituent assembly met for three weeks beginning on 21 April 1949. On 8 May, it approved major changes to the constitution: the Shah was granted the right to dissolve parliament; the authority to hold new elections so that a new parliament would be formed within three months of dismissing the old one; and the establishment of a bicameral legislature, with a National Assembly as the lower house and a Senate as the upper house. A minor amendment also revised the process for implementing future constitutional changes. In January 1950, the first Iranian senate commenced, with the Shah appointing half of its 60 members.

==== Oil crisis ====
The Shah's actions drew the ire of Mohammad Mosaddegh, an prominent career politician and senior opposition figure. In response to the Shah's selection of royalists sympathetic to his views and concerns over the manipulation of general elections, Mosaddegh called for protests, which took place in late 1949.

In April 1951, the Majles named Mossaddegh as prime minister by a vote of 79–12. Shortly afterward, he nationalized the British-owned oil industry. The Shah opposed Mossadegh's actions, fearing that a Western-imposed oil embargo and a lack of domestic technical expertise would leave Iran in economic ruin. After a two-year political struggle, the Shah briefly left the country but returned following a coup orchestrated by British and American intelligence against Mossadegh on 19 August 1953. Mossadegh was subsequently arrested by pro-Shah army forces.

=== Cold War era ===
Following the overthrow of Mossadegh, Iran became geopolitically aligned with the United States as part of broader Western efforts to contain Soviet influence during the Cold War. During the presidency of John F. Kennedy, the United States regarded Iran as a significant regional ally, perceiving it as a rare source of stability in the Middle East and against Soviet expansionism.

Iran adopted a modified version of its national flag in 1964, changing its ratio from 1:3 to 4:7. It retained the stripes of its green, white, and red horizontal tricolour with the traditional "Lion and Sun" (Shir-o-Khorshid) emblem in the centre.

On 12–16 October 1971, an elaborate set of celebrations and festivities for the 2,500-year celebration of the Persian Empire occurred in commemoration of the founding of the Achaemenid Empire by Cyrus the Great.

=== Collapse of the monarchy ===
The Shah's government used suppression against its opponents with the help of Iran's security and intelligence secret police, SAVAK. Such opponents included communists, socialists, and Islamists. By the mid-1970s, relying on increased oil revenues, a series of plans were made for the progress of the country through the "White Revolution". However, Reza's economic advances and cultural reforms increasingly irritated the clergy. Islamic leaders, particularly the cleric Ayatollah Ruhollah Khomeini, were able to focus this discontent with an ideology tied to Islamic principles that called for the overthrow of the Shah and a return to Islamic traditions. This led to the successful Iranian Revolution of 1979 and a new, still undemocratic, regime.

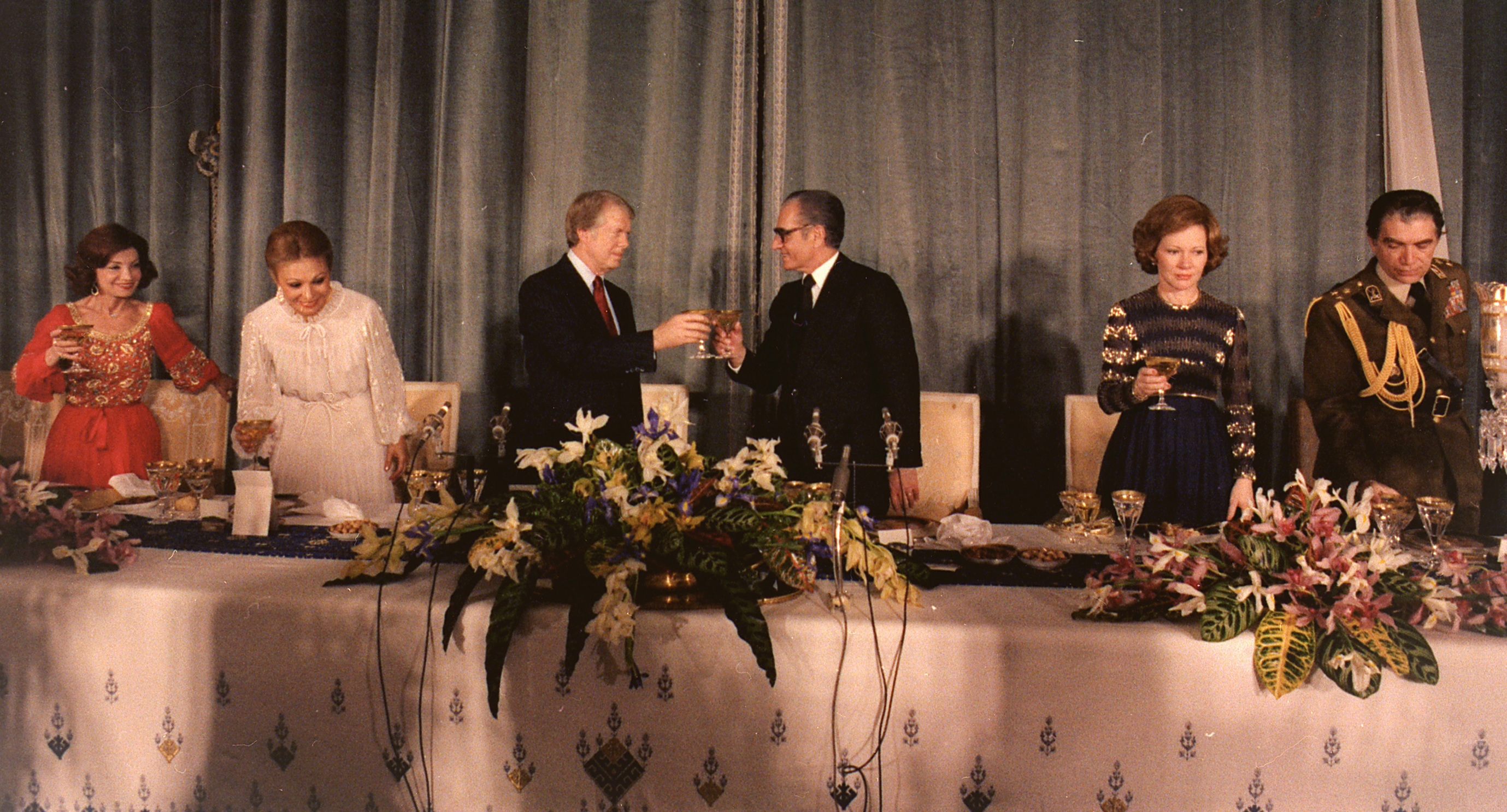
Jimmy Carter and Mohammad Reza Pahlavi toasting each other at Niavaran Palace on 31 December 1977

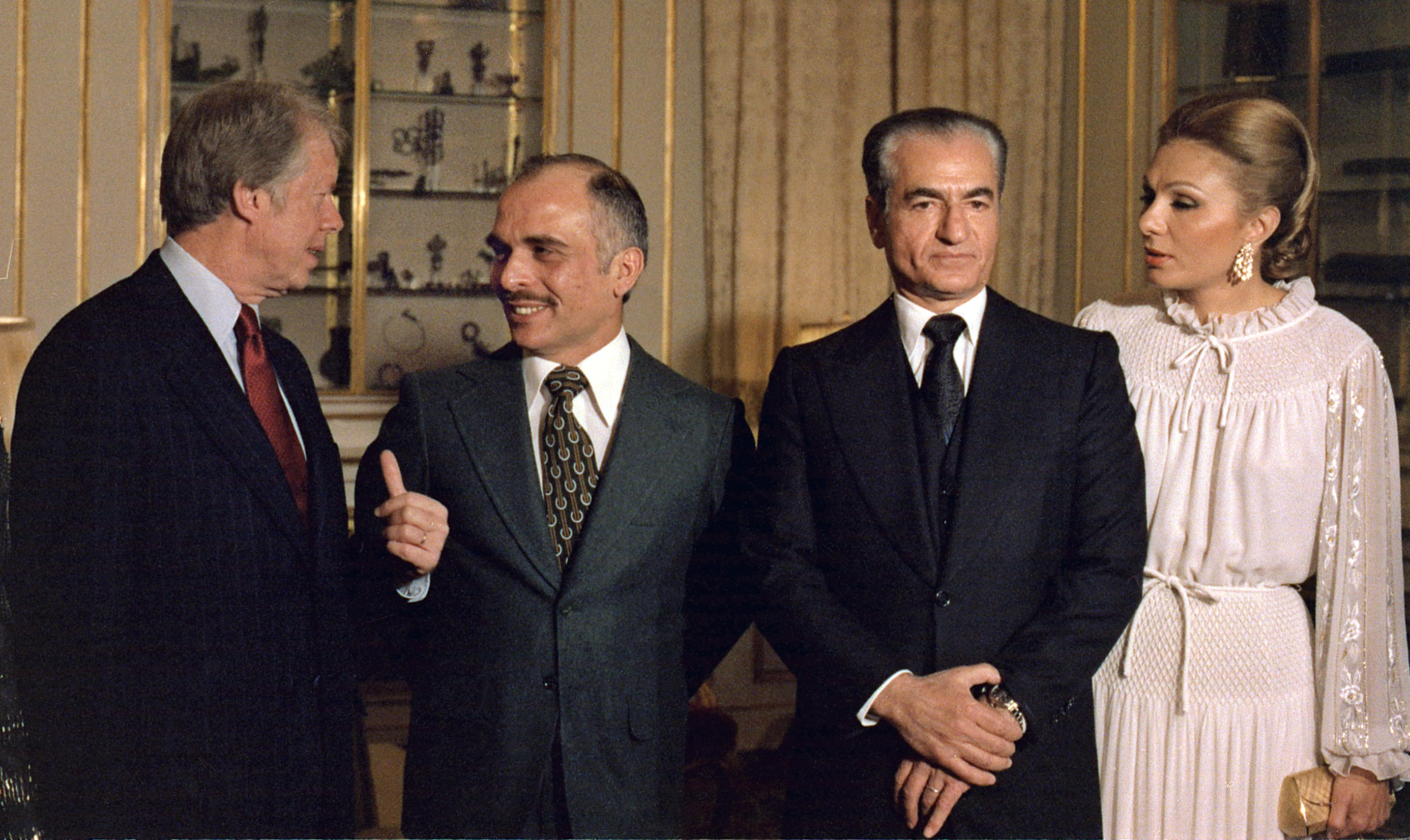
Mohammad Reza Pahlavi, Farah Pahlavi, U.S. President Jimmy Carter and Hussein of Jordan, 1977

Khomeini appointed the politically moderate Mehdi Bazargan as prime minister, who served from 11 February to 6 November 1979. Barzagan resigned under Khomeini's growing extremism, authoritarianism and de facto control, after he first attempted to resign in March. The Islamic Revolution dissolved the SAVAK and replaced it with the SAVAMA. It was run after the revolution, according to U.S. sources and Iranian exile sources in the U.S. and in Paris, by General Hossein Fardoust, who was deputy chief of SAVAK under Mohammad Reza's rule and a friend from boyhood of the deposed monarch.

==== Exile and present-day ====
Mohammad Reza fled the country on 16 January 1979, seeking medical treatment in Egypt, Mexico, the United States, and Panama, and finally resettled with his family in Egypt as a guest of Anwar Sadat. On his death on 27 July 1980, his son Reza Pahlavi, who was formally invested as Crown Prince on 26 October 1967, succeeded him as head of the Pahlavi dynasty. In 2013, Reza Pahlavi established the Iran National Council in Paris, which serves as a government in exile to reclaim the former throne after a potential overthrow of the current Islamic Republic government. However, in February 2019, Pahlavi launched an initiative called the Phoenix Project of Iran. According to the National Interest, this is "designed to bring the various strains of the opposition closer to a common vision for a post-clerical Iran."

== Government and politics ==
The political system of the Imperial State of Iran took place in a parliamentary constitutional monarchy where the Shah served as the head of state and the prime minister as its head of government. The National Consultative Assembly was the nation's unicameral parliament, from 1949 it became the lower house when the Senate was established as its upper house of the parliament.

== Legacy ==
Reza Shah is credited with the reunification of Iran under a powerful central government. This led to a resurgence of Persian nationalism up until 1979, which, among other measures, was achieved through an official ban on the use of minority languages in schools and newspapers, and the successful quelling of separatist movements.

During the twenty-first century, the Pahlavi era has often been associated with the modernization and economic growth of the Iranian state in the twentieth century, contributing to the continued visibility of its rulers among the population both inside Iran and within the diaspora. Chants such as “Javid Shah” (“Long live the Shah”), and "Reza Shah, bless your soul" have reportedly seen widespread use among demonstrators opposing the Islamic Republic, including during the Mahsa Amini protests and the 2025–2026 Iranian protests.

=== Human rights ===
During the Pahlavi era, secret police, torture, and capital punishment were utilized frequently to stifle political dissent. The dynasty has been described as an "imperial dictatorship" or "one-man rule". Although the country enjoyed a brief interlude of democracy after 1941, the Anglo-American backed coup d'etat in 1953 allowed the Shah to consolidate power.

=== Corruption ===
Manouchehr Ganji led an anti-corruption study group which submitted at least 30 reports in 13 years detailing corruption of high-ranking officials and the royal circle, but the Shah called the reports "false rumors and fabrications". Parviz Sabeti, a high-ranking official of SAVAK, believed that the one important reason for successful opposition to the regime was the allegations of corruption.

== Notable persons ==
- Jamie Masada (born 1954), Iranian-American businessman and comedian

== See also ==
- Pahlavi dynasty
- History of Iran
- List of kings of Persia
- List of Shia dynasties

== Notes ==
State of Iran
Preceded by Sublime State of Persia	Imperial State of Iran; 1925–1979	Succeeded by Interim Government of Iran
