= Iran-e-No Party =

- Leader: Abdolhossein Teymourtash
- Founded: July 1927
- Dissolved: 1927
- Preceded by: Revival Party
- Succeeded by: Progress Party
- Ideology: Monarchism; Secularism; Anti-clericalism

Iran-e-No Party (Persian: حزب ایران نو, romanized: Ḥezb-e Irān-e Now, lit. 'New Iran Party') was a short-lived fascist and anticlerical party in Iran of which the motto was "loyalty to the Shah and devotion to progress." The party was cofounded by Abdolhossein Teymourtash in an attempt to form a one-party state. Among the founders were General Morteza Yazdanpanah and the private secretary of Reza Shah, Faraj Allah Bahrami.

It incorporated most existing parties and became unwieldy as the aspirants to office were eager to join it. Within a few months, it caused a moribund inside the party and a turmoil outside to oppose it, eventually leading to its dissolution. The party mobilized support for Reza Shah, but soon was replaced by its offshoot the Progress Party.
