= Learned Council =

Defunct political party in Qajar Iran

- Chamber: Iranian Parliament
- Legislature(s): 3rd
- Foundation: 1914
- Dissolution: 1915
- Leader: Hassan Modarres
- Representation: 17 / 115 (15%)
- Ideology: Conservatism
- Political position: Right-wing

The Learned Council (Persian: هیئت علمیه, romanized: Heyʿat-e Elmīyeh) was a political group of clerics in the 3rd Parliament, led by Hassan Modarres.

According to Touraj Daryaee, it did not consider itself a party and was a group of "hardline rightists particularly opposed to the Democrats". The group opposed the policy of centralization advocated by the government, secularization of penal code, property tax, conscription and women's suffrage.
