= 1950 Iranian legislative election =

- 1950

All 136 seats to the National Consultative Assembly
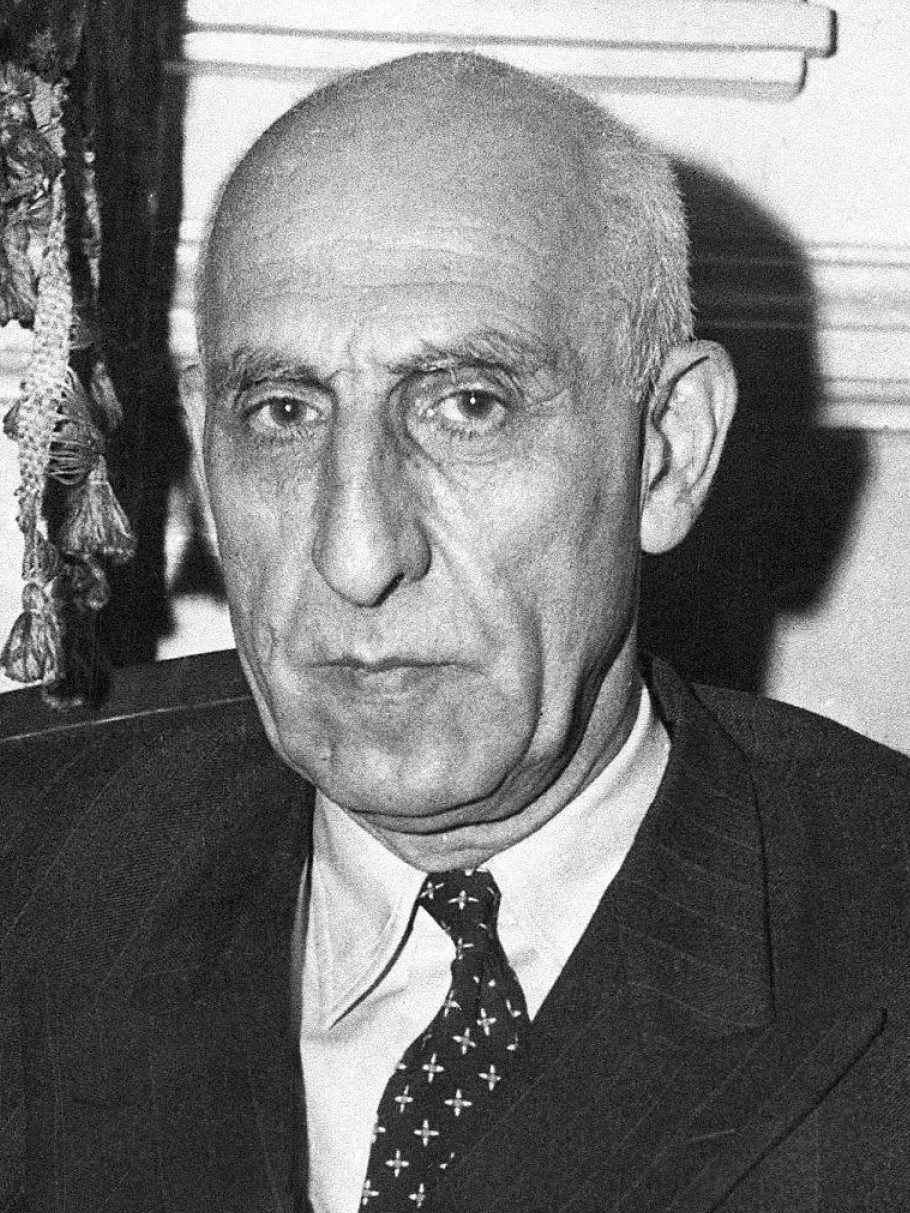

	First party	Second party
Leader	Mohammad Mosaddegh
Party	Parties: Iran Party; Party of the Iranian People; Society of Muslim Warriors; Third Force	Independent
Alliance	National Front
Leader's seat	Tehran
Seats won	8≈11	126

Parliamentary elections were held in Iran in 1950.

== Background ==
Elections for the 16th Majlis began in late July 1949. The 16th Majlis was to be a bicameral parliament composed of the Majlis as the lower house and the Senate as the upper house. Following a framework set down in the 1906 Constitution, the Shah began appointing 30 of the 60 senators. As a reaction to the Shah's selection of royalists friendly to his views, and concerns about his rigging of the general elections, Mohammad Mosaddegh called for a protest on 13 October 1949. Thousands marched from his mansion to the royal palace gardens. There, in a meeting with Interior Minister Abdolhossein Hazhir, 20 opposition and radical politicians led by Mosaddegh demanded a halt to the Shah's hindrance of free elections. After three days of sit-in protest they extracted a promise from Hazhir that he would conduct elections fairly. Directly afterward, the committee of 20 formed the National Front coalition. In the next few weeks, elections were challenged as rigged. As a result, Hazhir was assassinated on 4–5 November 1949 by the Fada'iyan-e Islam. In February 1950 at the conclusion of elections for the 16th Majlis, the National Front took eight seats in the Majlis—Abol-Ghasem Kashani and Mosaddegh both won seats—and from that platform for the next few years continued to call for reductions in the power of the monarchy; a return to the Constitution of 1906. With the backing of the extremist Fada'iyan, the regular clergy, and the middle-class people, despite its minority toehold in parliament, the National Front became the main opposition movement of Iran. The self-serving constitutional changes had created a backlash against the Shah.

== Campaign ==
On 28 July 1949, the term of the 15th Majlis came to its natural end. Abdolhossein Hazhir, the Shah's interior minister, initiated preparations to hold elections for the 16th Majlis, including Iran's first Senate. The Shah began selecting the 30 senators that were his to choose. The election was held, and it became clear that rural Iran was voting in favor of royalist supporters of the Shah. Mosaddegh and others reacted to what they saw as rigged results in rural elections by organizing a protest. Mosaddegh called for the people of Tehran to join him in marching on the royal palace on 13 October 1949. Thousands of workers, students and middle-class people gathered at his estate and walked together to the royal palace gates where they requested bast (political sanctuary), a traditional act requiring the king to provide protection. After messages were exchanged between the people and the palace, 20 of the crowd were selected as leaders, with Mosaddegh at the head. These 20 were allowed inside the royal grounds to begin bast, in this case a form of sit-in protest. They passed a message to the Shah saying that Interior Minister Abdolhossein Hazhir had rigged the elections in rural Iran. Mosaddegh wrote a note to Hazhir saying that, "the main reason for our sit-in is that in this period of parliamentary recess when the appointment of a Prime Minister does not require a vote of inclination by the Majlis, we hope His Majesty can appoint a government whose goal is to preserve the interests of the monarchy and the nation." The protesters spent several days in bast, including a hunger strike of two days. Finally, Hazhir met with the 20 himself and promised that the elections would be examined for fairness. If found unfair the results would be dismissed and new elections would be held. This answered the concerns of the protesters and they declared a success. Afterward, the committee of 20 returned to Mosaddegh's mansion where they agreed to form the National Front coalition. In the following weeks, the investigation of the elections commenced; many Iranians thought there would be some sort of smooth coverup of royal wrongdoing. However, on 4 November 1949, Hazhir was shot by the Fada'iyan, dying the next day. The Shah thus realized the depth of popular feeling formed against his electoral machinations; he declared the voting results invalid on 11 November. New elections were to be held in February 1950. The Fada'iyan guarded the polls to stop royal interference.

== Results ==
According to Michele Penner Angrist, Fakhreddin Azimi and John Limbert, the National Front gained eight out of 136 seats. Mosaddegh and seven other leaders of the front were elected to the Majlis; in Tehran, Mosaddegh received the highest number of votes of any candidate. Ervand Abrahamian says they had eleven seats.
