= 1906 Persian legislative election =

- 17 September 1906

All 156 seats to the National Consultative Assembly
Alliance	Moderates	Radicals	Independent
Seats won	35	21	100
Elected Prime Minister
Mirza Nasrullah Khan
Independent

The first Iranian legislative election held on 17 September 1906 after the Iranian Constitutional Revolution by a sentence from Mozaffar ad-Din Shah Qajar.

First, on 27 September 1906, Mirza Nasrullah Khan was elected as the first elected Prime Minister of Iran; but before he could officially take office, he was dismissed by the Majlis again, and then the Majlis elected Ali Asghar Atabak as Prime Minister, but since Atabak was abroad, a provisional government was formed headed by Soltan-Ali Vazir-e Afkham.
