= 1937 Iranian legislative election =

- Spring and Summer 1937

All 136 seats of the National Consultative Assembly
	First party
Party	Independent
Seats won	136

The elections for the eleventh Majlis were held during the spring and summer of 1937 and all deputies were elected to the parliament.

Like many other elections under the rule of Reza Shah, the election was "systematically controlled by the royal court". Well-known and important figures of ulama failed to win even a single seat in the elections.
