= 1941 Iranian legislative election =

- 31 August 1941

All 136 seats of the National Consultative Assembly
	First party
Party	Independent
Seats won	136

Parliamentary elections were held in Iran began in September 1941, when Reza Shah was still in power, and were continued during the Anglo-Soviet invasion of Iran and succession of his son Mohammad Reza Pahlavi.

Prime Minister Mohammad Ali Foroughi came under great pressures to nullify the election results which were considered devoid of legitimacy.

Immediately after the elections and departure of Reza Shah, members of the parliament who were individually handpicked by him before his abdication, turned around and asked for investigations on his "misdeeds".
