= Fakhreddin Azimi =

Iranian history professor

Fakhreddin Azimi is a professor of history at the University of Connecticut. He graduated from the University of Tehran with a B.A. in political science and earned a M.Sc. from the SOAS University of London and a D.Phil. from St Antony's College, Oxford.

== Selected publications ==
- The Quest for Democracy in Iran: a Century of Struggle against Authoritarian Rule (Cambridge, Mass.: Harvard University Press, 2008); ISBN 978-0674027787
- Iran: The Crisis of Democracy, 1941-53 (New York & London 1989); revised paperback edition in process; ISBN 978-1850430933
