= 1935 Iranian legislative election =

1935 Persian legislative election
- 1935

All 137 seats to the National Consultative Assembly
	Majority party
Party	Independent
Seats won	136

The elections for the tenth Majlis were held in the spring of 1935.

People of Greater Tunb were invited to vote in the elections as part of the Bandar Abbas constituency.
