= 1926 Persian legislative election =

- Until 27 June 1926

All 136 seats to the National Consultative Assembly
	First party
Party	Independent
Seats won	136
Prime Minister before election
Zoka-ol-Molk
Revival Party
Elected Prime Minister
Mostowfi ol-Mamalek
Revival Party

The elections for the sixth Majlis ended on 27 June 1926.

== Electoral fairness ==
The election was the first one encompassed by the reign of Reza Shah as the king. To ensure that deputies remained pliant, the shah took away parliamentary immunity and banned all political parties. It was the only election that retained some credibility until 1944 Iranian legislative election, since its elections were not wholly manipulated. A few critics of Reza Shah managed to win seats in Tehran, including Hassan Modarres who gained the highest number of votes, Mohammad Mossadegh, Hassan Mostowfi and Hossein Pirnia.

According to a report by British minister plenipotentiary dated as early 1926, "the Persian Majles cannot be taken seriously. The deputies are not free agents, any more than the elections to the Majles are free. When the Shah wants a measure, it is passed. When he is opposed, it is withdrawn. When he is indifferent, a great deal of aimless discussion takes place."
