= 1930 Persian legislative election =

- Summer 1930

All 136 seats to the National Consultative Assembly
	Majority party
Party	Independent
Seats won	136

The elections for the eighth Majlis were held in the summer of 1930.

The Communist Party planned to run their own candidates, however they failed due to internal conflicts, as well as Reza Shah's substantial control over the process.

Like its predecessor, the election was "systematically controlled by the royal court".
