= 1914 Persian legislative election =

- 1914

All 115 seats in the National Consultative Assembly
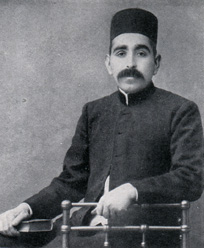

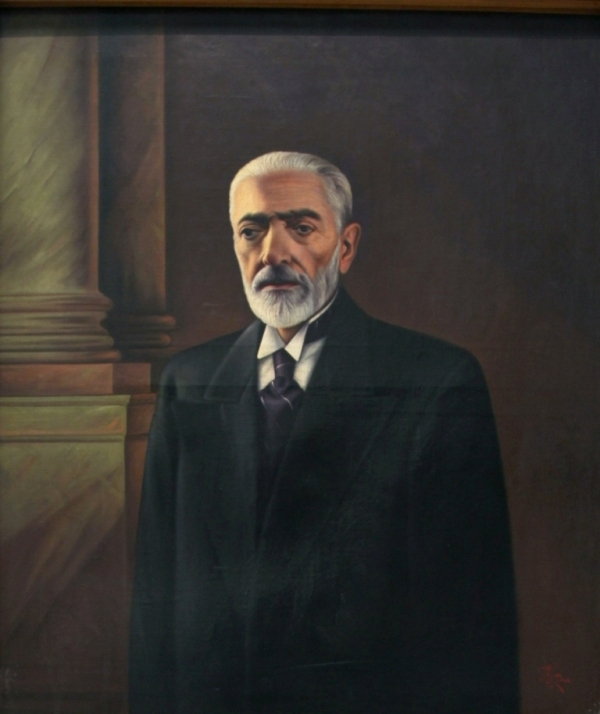

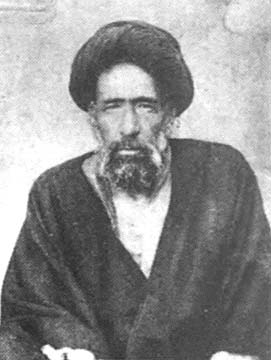
	First party	Second party
Leader	Soleiman Eskandari	Mohammad-Sadegh Tabatabaei
Party	Democrat Party	Moderate Socialists Party
Leader's seat	Isfahan	Tehran
Seats won	31	29 (Note: Some members of the Moderate Socialists Party, led by Ali-Mohammad Dowlatabadi, became allied with the majority Democrat Party in the parliament.)
Seat change	▲3	▼7
	Third party	Fourth party
Leader	Hassan Modarres
Party	Learned Council	Independent
Leader's seat	Tehran
Seats won	14	41
Seat change	New	▼14
Prime Minister before election
Mostowfi ol-Mamalek
Elected Prime Minister
Mostowfi ol-Mamalek

Parliamentary elections were held in Persia in 1914. The new Parliament convened on 6 December.
