= Soltan-Ali Vazir-e Afkham =

Iranian politician

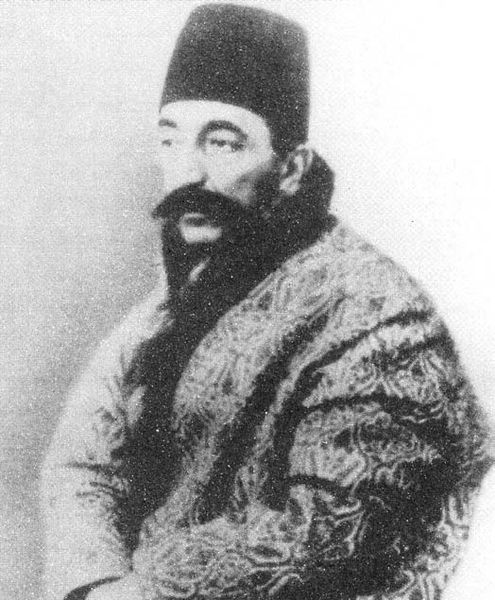

Interior Minister and Acting Head of Cabinet of Iran
- In office 21 March 1907 – 30 April 1907
- Monarch: Mohammad Ali Shah Qajar
- Preceded by: Mirza Nasrullah Khan (as Premier of Persia)
- Succeeded by: Mirza Ali Asghar Khan Amin al-Soltan

Personal details
- Born: 1862 Tehran, Iran
- Died: 13 July 1914 (aged 51–52) Tehran, Iran
- Party: Independent

Soltan-Ali Vazir-e Afkham (Persian: سلطان‌علی وزیر افخم; 13 December 1862 – 13 July 1914), was an Iranian politician who served as Acting Prime Minister and Interior minister of Iran from 21 March 1907 to 30 April 1907.
