= Social Democratic Party (Iran) =

Iranian Political party

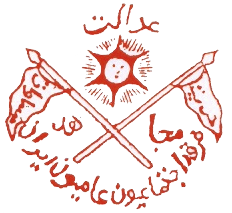
- Leader: Nariman Narimanov
- Founder: Haydar Khan Amo-oghli
- Founded: 1904 or 1905
- Dissolved: February 1910
- Succeeded by: Democrat Party
- Headquarters: Baku, Caucasus
- Newspaper: Iran-e No
- Ideology: Socialism (Iranian); Liberalism (Iranian); Secularism (Iranian); Iranian nationalism Constitutionalism
- Political position: Left-wing
- 1st Iranian Majlis (1906): 21 / 156

The Social Democratic Party (Persian: فرقه اجتماعیون عامیون, romanized: Ferqa'ye Ejtemāʿīyūn-e ʿāmmīyūn) was a political party formed by Persian emigrants in Transcaucasia with the help of local revolutionaries, maintaining close ties to the Russian Social Democratic Labour Party and Hummat.

It was the first Iranian socialist organization.

During the years of the Persian Constitutional Revolution, the Ferqa'ye Ejtemāʿīyūn-e ʿāmmīyūn (Society of Common Socialists) rendered undeniable services. The term Ejtemāʿīyūn-e ʿāmmīyūn means "Social Democrats." In any case, just as the Social Democratic Committee of Iran was linked to the Social Democratic Party of Transcaucasia, the Ferqa'ye Ejtemāʿīyūn-e ʿāmmīyūn of Iran was affiliated with the same-named organization in Baku. It was also referred to as the Iranian branch of the Mojāhedīn (Mujahidin) society.

The party created its own mélange of European socialism and indigenous ideas and upheld liberalism and nationalism. It maintained some religious beliefs while being critical of the conservative ulama and embracing separation of church and state.
