= 1956 Iranian legislative election =

- 1956

All 136 seats in the National Consultative Assembly

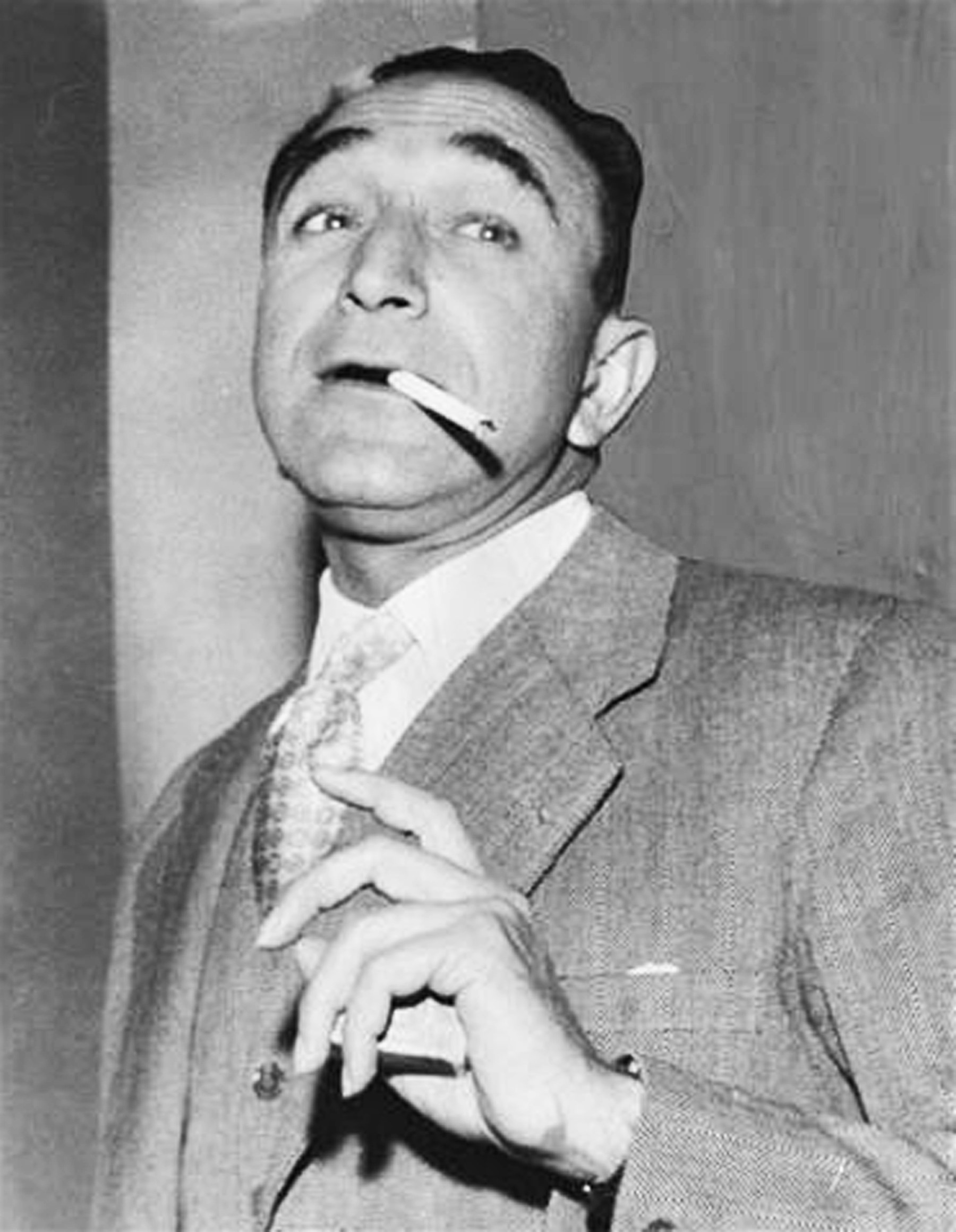
	First party	Second party
Leader	Manouchehr Eghbal	Asadollah Alam
Party	Nationalists' Party	People's Party
Seats won	71	36
Prime Minister before election
Hossein Ala'
Independent
Elected Prime Minister
Hossein Ala'
Independent

Parliamentary elections were held in Iran in 1956. The result was a victory for the Party of Nationalists, which won 71 of the 136 seats.

== Results ==
Party	Seats
Nationalists' Party	71
People's Party	36
Other parties	9
Independents	20
Total	136
Source: Nohlen et al.
