= Moderate Socialists Party =

- Leader: Disputed
- Parliamentary leader: Mohammad-Sadegh Tabatabaei
- Founded: 1909
- Dissolved: 1918
- Succeeded by: Reformers' Party
- Newspaper: Waqt; Majles
- Ideology: Moderation; Gradualism; Conservatism; Constitutionalism
- Religion: Islam

The Moderate Socialists Party (Persian: اجتماعیون اعتدالیون, romanized: Ejtemāʿīyūn-e eʿtedālīyūn) or simply Moderates Party (Persian: فرقه اعتدالیون), was a political party in Qajar Persia and one of the two major parties of the Constitutional Period alongside its parliamentary rival Social Democratic Party–Democrat Party. It was Iran's first right-wing political party.

== Members ==
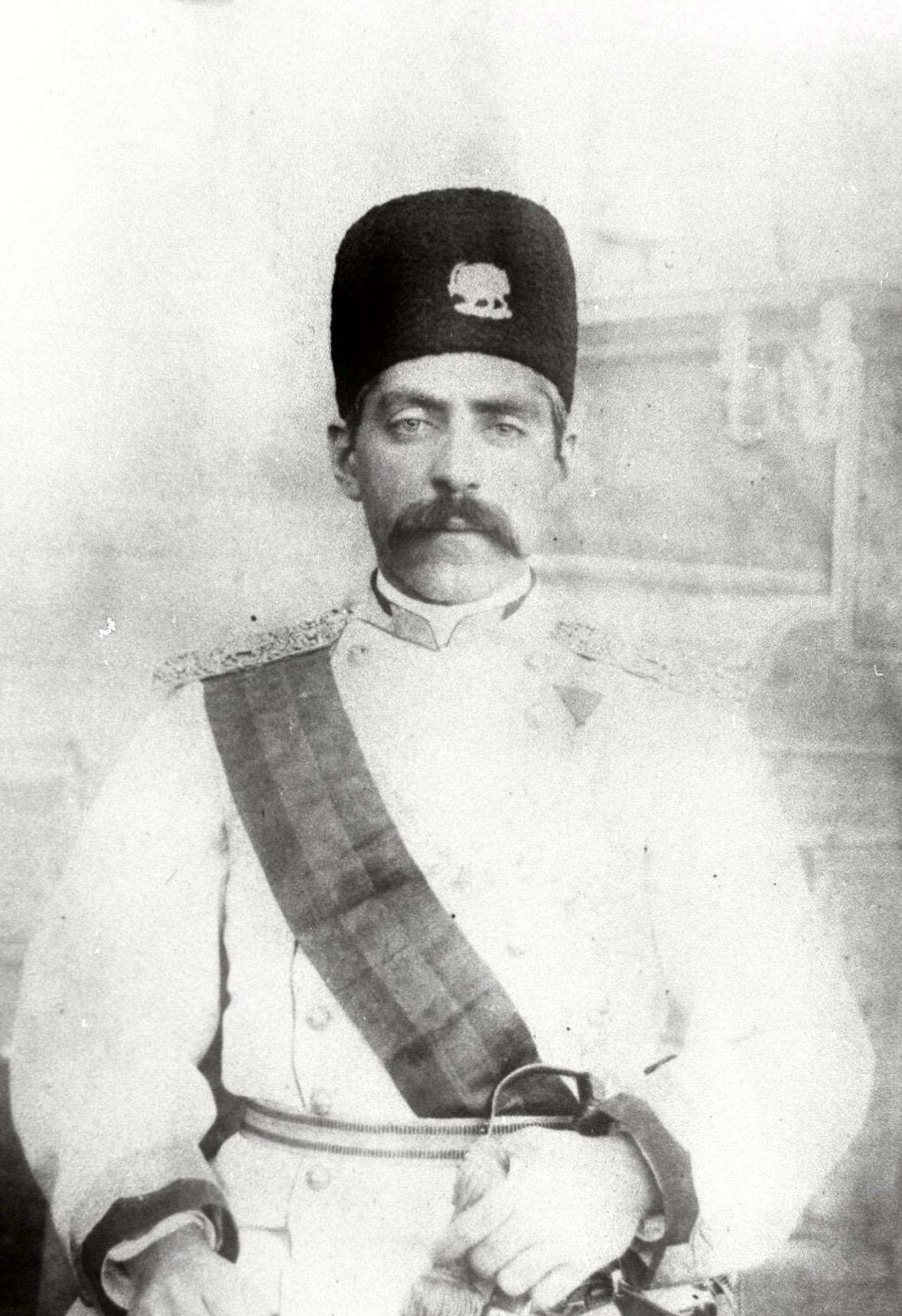
Abdol-Hossein Farman Farma, served as the prime minister of Iran under the Moderate Socialists party

The party membership consisted largely of landowners, constitutionalist ulema and bazaaris. It espoused the traditional middle-class and landed aristocracy. Notable members and supporters were:

- Sayyed Mohammad Tabatabai
- Sayyed Abdullah Behbahani
- Ali-Mohammad Dawlatabadi
- Mohammad Vali Khan Tonekaboni
- Abdol-Hossein Farmanfarma
- Abolqasem Naser al-Molk
- Ali-Akbar Dehkhoda
- Mohammad Mossadegh

== Views ==
The party claimed to uphold the principles of Islam, proposing military, judicial, and economic reforms, as well as strengthening the constitutional monarchy, convening the Senate, protecting family values, private property, limitation of the work week and wages in accordance with work performed, and prohibition of child labor. It also expressed support for freedom of association and freedom of the press.

== Parliament election results ==
Election	Seats				Quota
Election	Count	±	%	±	Quota
1906	35 / 156	—N/a	22.43	—N/a	Majority party as Moderates
1909	74 / 126	▲39	58.73	▲36.3	Majority in coalition Including 38 in coalition
1914	29 / 115	▼45	25.21	▼33.52	Minority
