= 1932 Persian legislative election =

- August 1932

All 137 seats to the National Consultative Assembly
	Majority party
Party	Independent
Seats won	136

Reza Shah issued a royal decree on 15 August 1932 for the ninth parliamentary elections to be held, and the elections started on the following day. The elections are considered fraudulent and "systematically controlled by the royal court".
