= Progress Party (Iran) =

- Leader: Abdolhossein Teymourtash
- Founded: September 1927
- Dissolved: late 1932
- Preceded by: New Iran Party
- Ideology: Fascism; Monarchism; Secularism
- Political position: Far-right

Progress Party or Party for Progress (Persian: حزب ترقی, romanized: Ḥezb-e taraqqi) was a fascist political party in Iran led by Abdolhossein Teymourtash, described as the "spurious" party of government and functioning as a "vehicle for executing royal intentions" of Reza Shah.

Modeled after Mussolini's National Fascist Party and Atatürk's Republican People's Party, it subscribed ideas similar to the short-lived New Iran Party.

With the fall of Abdolhossein Teymourtash in late 1932, the party soon melted away and was outlawed on the grounds that it harbors republican sentiments.
