= 1954 Iranian general election =

1954 Iranian legislative election
- January–March 1954

All 136 seats to the National Consultative Assembly
	First party
Party	Independent
Seats won	136
Prime Minister before election
Fazlollah Zahedi
Elected Prime Minister
Fazlollah Zahedi

Parliamentary elections were held in Iran in 1954. Political parties were banned from contesting the election, and all 136 elected MPs were independents.

The elections were "rigged and far from a legitimate process".

Upper house elections began in February while the lower house elections in provinces began at the same time. Lower house election in Tehran was held on March 9 and 10.

== Campaign ==
The outlawed opposition formed by the National Front activists after 1953 coup d'état, 'National Resistance Movement' (NRM) put all its effort to campaign for its twelve candidates in Tehran, namely Ahmad Razavi, Abdollah Moazzami, Allahyar Saleh, Ali Shayegan, Kazem Hassibi, Mohammad-Ali Angaji, Mahmoud Nariman, Karim Sanjabi, Bagher Jalali Mousavi, Asghar Parsa, Ahmad Akhgar and Ahmad Zirakzadeh, of whom some were in hiding. However, they could not rely on a vast network of activists because of suffering from organizational weakness. To distribute NRM statements in Tehran, Bazargan and Bakhtiar had to take taxi and throw the paper out of the window and speak in French to conceal their identity and purpose from the driver. Bazargan organized some 2,000 nationalists to vote in Sepahsalar Mosque, however they were barred from casting their vote by the security forces, the čāqukeš led by Shaban Jafari and fascist organizations like SUMKA, who were present in the streets.

== Results ==
- In Tehran, all 12 winners declared were pro-Shah candidates led by Ja'far Behbahani. A seat was also given to Mohammad Derakhshesh, a trade unionist and chairman of Teachers Association.

== Media coverage ==
=== In the United States ===
The New York Times wrote that a voter bowed three times to the ballot box and when asked why, he said "I am merely making my obeisance to the magic box. When one drops in a ballot for Mohammad [Mosaddeq], lo, when the ballot is opened it is transformed into a vote for Fazlollah [Zahedi]".

Time magazine reported:

Item: a constituency near Kerman beat up the man Zahedi sent there to be elected; Zahedi suspended the balloting. Item: a former Iranian ambassador to the U.S. [Allahyar Saleh] announced himself as a pro-Mossadegh candidate from Kashan; Zahedi forced him to remain in Teheran.; Item: the powerful Zolfaghari tribe in the northwest rigged the election of two pro-Mossadegh deputies; Zahedi arrested the chiefs for using "undue force" on the voters. Moral: nobody in Iran save Fazlollah Zahedi is allowed to use undue force on voters

— Time
