= 1928 Persian legislative election =

- 1928

All 136 seats to the National Consultative Assembly
	Majority party	Minority party
Leader	Abdolhossein Teymourtash
Party	Progress Party	Independent
Leader's seat	Did not stand
Seats won	122	14
Percentage	90%	10%
Prime Minister before election
Mehdi Qoli Hedayat
Elected Prime Minister
Mehdi Qoli Hedayat

In the elections for the seventh Majlis, systematically rigged by the military and Interior ministry, handpicked representatives of Reza Shah were chosen to the parliament to ensure the exclusion of recalcitrants and "unsuitable candidates who insisted on running found themselves either in jail or banished from their localities".

During the campaign, all public speeches were prohibited by police.

Hassan Modarres who was Tehran's most voted deputy in the previous election, was expelled without even a single vote in his favor. He objected the results, famously asking "What about the vote that I had cast for myself?". Other candidates such as Mohammad Mossadegh, Hassan Taghizadeh and Hossein Ala' were not elected despite the demand for them.

The royalist supporters of Reza Shah flourishing in Progress Party, were the majority of the parliament, dominating about 90% of the seats.

The opposition was a minority with only two-seats held by Mohammad Farrokhi Yazdi representing Yazd and Mahmoud Reza Tolou of Lahijan.
