= 1939 Iranian legislative election =

- July–August 1939

All 136 seats of the National Consultative Assembly
	First party
Party	Independent
Seats won	136

Parliamentary elections were held in Iran in 1939, throughout the month of July and most of August. They were the last elections held during the reign of Reza Shah and were not considered free.
