= 1949 Iranian Constituent Assembly election =

Modification of the Persian Constitution of 1906

In 1949, a Constituent Assembly was held in Iran to modify the Persian Constitution of 1906. Shah Mohammad Reza Pahlavi convened the assembly in April; he sought a royal prerogative giving him the right to dismiss the parliament, providing that new elections were held to form a new parliament. He also specified a method for future amendments to the Constitution. The amendments were made in May 1949 by unanimous vote of the Constituent Assembly.

During the previous year, the Shah had been considering changes to the Constitution as part of his various plans to increase the power of the monarchy. He was advised against this action by British and American diplomats who thought it unwise to unbalance the separation of powers. On 4 February 1949, an assassin shot at the Shah, two bullets wounding him. That evening, the government declared martial law and a special session of parliament imposed harsh measures against the Shah's political enemies. The assassin was suspected of being connected to the religious fundamentalist group Fada'iyan-e Islam (Martyrs for Islam, or Devotees of Islam), and loosely associated with the communist-leaning Tudeh Party of Iran. The parliament outlawed the Tudeh Party and had its leaders arrested. The Shah sent pragmatic Ayatollah Abol-Ghasem Kashani to exile—he had formed a strategic alliance with the Fada'iyan. In an atmosphere of national sympathy for the monarchy, the Shah called for a constituent assembly to make amendments to the Constitution, to give him more power. He selected the constituent assembly members from his supporters. He also increased his pressure for the formation of the Senate of Iran, an upper house of parliament that had been written into the constitution in 1906 but never formed. The Senate was expected to favor the Shah.

== Background ==
In 1906 during the drafting of the first Persian Constitution, a bicameral parliament was agreed upon in order to obtain royal approval from Mozaffar ad-Din Shah Qajar. The shah was to appoint half of the 60 members of the upper house, the Senate. The other half of the Senate was to be elected by a two-stage process. The shah expected to be able to control legislation by influencing the Senate. Mozaffar ad-Din Shah Qajar signed the Constitution at the end of December 1906 but died unexpectedly of a heart attack a few days later. Radical politicians and other constitutional delegates did not want a Senate, and after the shah died no action was taken to form one. In mid-1907, the Anjumans of the Mujahidin, a group of workers, artisans and peasants, called for much wider voting rights for men, and they expressed a wish that the Senate never be formed because it would make the nobility more powerful.

The Constitution allowed for a board of ulama (Islamic scholars) who would oversee decisions made by the parliament. The ulama were to be given veto power over legislation. Ayatollah Mirza Sayyed Mohammad Tabatabai was one of those who influenced the composition and adoption of the 1906 Constitution, but he never insisted upon the formation of the board of ulama. Rather, the wishes of the ulama were usually voiced by several members of the Majlis.

Ever since assuming the throne in 1941, the young Shah Mohammad Reza Pahlavi had been working to increase his power. He wanted more weapons and men for the military, which he controlled, and he wanted financial aid from the US. In September 1948, he sent National Bank director Abolhassan Ebtehaj to the US to ask the government of Harry S. Truman for military aid or financial support, and to present the idea that the Shah would activate the Senate. Ebtehaj disclosed the Shah's wish to change the Constitution so that he could dismiss an uncooperative parliament and authorize new elections. The US State Department signaled Ambassador John Cooper Wiley to meet with the Shah to relay Truman's view that the US saw no need for "constitutional reform" since the Shah directed Iran's outward-looking affairs of defense and foreign policy; the US represented that the Shah was not supposed to be in charge of internal politics. This message was affirmed by British Ambassador John Le Rougetel who, seeking stability in Iran's oil industry and continued influence in Iran's parliament, said the UK also advised caution with regard to changes in Iran's constitution. The US State Department prepared a report in January 1949 describing the goal of US diplomacy in Iran as the prevention of any widening of Soviet influence. To that end, the Shah was seen as the most reliable bulwark against Communist aggression in Iran. He was invited to come visit Truman to discuss mutual concerns.

== 1949 ==
=== Assassination attempt ===
On 4 February 1949, the Shah visited the Faculty of Law and Political Science at the University of Tehran, a symbol of secular success against the former monopoly of Islamic scholars who had previously controlled all aspects of the judicial branch of government. The Shah's visit was a celebration of the law school's anniversary. As the Shah walked from his limousine to the school steps a little after 1 pm, Nasser Fakhrarai approached him from the press area and fired a revolver. The first shot missed but the Shah's guards dropped and took cover, failing to protect him. Despite the lack of interference, the second and third shots also missed. The fourth bullet pierced the Shah's lip and cheek, knocking out some front teeth. The fifth bullet wounded his shoulder. When the gun jammed on the sixth round, Fakhrarai ran to escape. He was stopped by soldiers who quickly killed him with rifle butts and point-blank shots. At 7 pm from the hospital, the Shah spoke by radio to the country, thanking them for their support. A photo of him dressed in a hospital gown with his cheek in a bandage was published the next day in the newspapers, showing his stoicism. President Truman sent the Shah a note wishing a quick return to good health.

The assassin Fakhrarai was found with a journalist's press card showing that he worked for Parcham-e Islam (The Banner of Islam, or Flag of Islam), a religious newspaper opposed to secularism, and that he paid dues to the journalist's labor union loosely associated with the Tudeh Party. He had been posing as a photographer, hiding the gun in the camera case. Anxious to blame the Communists, the Shah seized the opportunity to declare a conspiracy of religious and Communist radicals, and he decreed martial law. He ordered an emergency session of the Majlis the same night he was shot. Through this session he suppressed his political opposition, including what would prove an ineffective ban on the Tudeh Party. The Shah ordered the closure of newspapers critical of his policies, and for treasonous activities he arrested 28 Tudeh leaders including the most prominent members of the Central Council of United Trade Unions (CCUTU). Mosaddegh was briefly confined to house arrest, and because the Fada'iyan were suspected, Kashani was exiled to Lebanon. Later it was determined that Fakhrarai had been planning the assassination alone for three years and had twice attempted it, failing to get close enough each time. The revolver had been given to him by Abdullah Arghani, a childhood friend who was a more radical member of the Tudeh Party, and was sympathetic to Fakhrarai's assassination plan. The press card had been forged.

=== Constitutional changes ===
Following the assassination attempt, there was an atmosphere of sympathy expressed by the people of Iran for the Shah. The Shah used this to his advantage to promote his goal of increasing the power of the monarchy.

On 17 February 1949, the Majlis passed the Shah's Seven Year Plan, an economic program that had its roots in an economic council of 1946 and a Supreme Planning Board formed in November 1947. The Seven Year Plan was intended to be an autonomous body, independent of political forces, but the Shah saw it as a vehicle for land reform measures that would reinforce his power. With 25% of its monies earmarked for helping to fight poverty in agrarian Iran, the Shah felt that the Seven Year Plan would make the disaffected rural poor more resistant to Soviet influence. Others thought that so much emphasis on agriculture would prevent Iran from growing out of its traditional role as a resource "appendage" supplying more powerful countries. Before February 1949, the plan had proven unpopular with the Majlis who saw it as a diminution of their political influence. Despite the Majlis vote of approval, the plan was never to be implemented as intended. By May 1949, some 40% had already been dedicated to industrial bailouts as opposed to the 14.3% originally planned. Another 40% was put toward the completion of rail lines; the Shah's plans were not realized.

As part of his effort to suppress religious radicals, the Shah asked Ayatollah Seyyed Hossein Borujerdi to rein in the more strident voices among the ulama. Borujerdi, Iran's senior Islamic scholar, believed in political quietism—that the ulama should not intervene in politics. Borujerdi had already established a pragmatic realpolitik arrangement with the Shah: the secular political domain would peacefully coexist with the religious domain for the advancement of both. He called a religious conference to meet in the holy city of Qom beginning 20 February 1949. Borujerdi directed the 2,000 conference attendees to discuss whether the ulama should take part in political activity; after due consideration, the consensus was for continued quietism. (The future Ayatollah Ruhollah Khomeini was among those who argued unsuccessfully for political activism.) The ulama determined the punishment for violations of quietism would be excommunication. Even so, some of the more radical ulama stayed active, including the Fada'iyan, and Kashani, exerting his influence from exile.

On 27 February 1949, the Majlis voted in support of the Shah's bill calling for a Constituent Assembly to re-examine the Constitution of 1906. In March, the Shah announced the convocation of this body and he raised the question of whether the Senate should be convened for the first time, as allowed for in 1906. To fill the Constituent Assembly, the Shah chose men who were friendly to his wishes. Seyyed Mohammad Sadiq Tabatabai, a veteran ally of the Pahlavi dynasty, was made leader. While the men were preparing to meet, the Shah pushed through laws against newspaper criticism of the royal family, and laws which changed crown land holdings from general ownership to ownership under his name alone.

Former Prime Minister Ahmad Qavam, writing from exile in Paris, published an open letter to the Shah which was very critical of any change to the Constitution. Qavam compared the Shah negatively to the hated Mohammad Ali Shah Qajar, Iran's short-lived ruler who fought to reverse the democratic advances allowed by his father in 1906. Qavam said the current shah would create a political backlash if he tried to take more power—a prediction that later proved correct. Rather than respond personally, the Shah directed former prime minister Ebrahim Hakimi to publish a severe chastisement of Qavam, accusing him of treasonous collusion with the Soviets during the Iran crisis of 1946. The Shah forbid newspapers in Tehran to print Qavam's first letter and a response; only Hakimi's letter was printed. The Shah also took away the honorific title of hazrat-e ashraf (his noblest excellency) that he had conferred upon Qavam for the same diplomatic achievements that were now being called treason.

Mosaddegh worked to secure the release of some of those who had been arrested, succeeding to free labor leader Taghi Fadakar. He was not successful with others of the labor activists who had been arrested or denounced for treason. Nineteen of these were sentenced by the Tehran Military Court to various prison terms on 23 April, and eight top leaders were sentenced to death on 18 May in absentia, including Communist labor organizer Reza Rousta. Seven of the condemned men were from the CCUTU.

The Constituent Assembly met for three weeks beginning 21 April 1949. On 8 May 1949, they signed the major change to the Constitution: Article 48 was amended to give the Shah the right to dissolve parliament, both the Majlis lower house and the Senate upper house, following which he was required to arrange new elections such that a new parliament would be formed within three months of dismissing the old one. A minor change was made to the Constitution regarding the process by which future amendments were to be implemented. At the same time, the Majlis passed the Shah's bill to hold elections enabling the Senate to be formed.

== Legacy ==
The Constitution as amended in 1949 remained unchanged until 1957 when the number of Majlis seats was increased by two, and the Shah was given the right to send financial legislation back to the Majlis for reconsideration. The 1963 Iranian constitutional referendum, was seen as an approval of the Shah's White Revolution program including women's right to vote and compulsory education of children. From 1950 through 1953, Mosaddegh sought to abolish the Senate; it was finally dissolved in early 1979 during the Iranian Revolution. A revolutionary Assembly of Experts met in June 1979 to establish an entirely new Constitution for the Islamic Republic of Iran, approved in the December 1979 Iranian constitutional referendum.
