= Reformers' Party =

Political party in Qajar Iran

- Leader: Hassan Modarres
- Dissolved: 1926 (banned)
- Preceded by: Moderate Socialists Party
- Ideology: Conservatism; Political decentralization
- Religion: Islam

Reformers' Party of Reformists Party (Persian: حزب اصلاح‌طلبان, romanized: Ḥezb-e Eṣlāḥṭalabān) was a political party in Iran, established in the final years of Qajar Iran. It was one of the four major parliamentary parties in early 1920s, along with the Communist Party, Socialist Party and Revival Party.

The party is an heir to the Moderate Socialists Party, and was founded by its former members joined by some Democrat Party affiliates.

The party held the majority in the 4th Parliament. It was also very influential outside the parliament. The party's opposition to Reza Khan, lead to losing its majority status in the 5th Parliament after he rigged the elections to have a parliament pliant to his views.
