= 1909 Persian legislative election =

- 1909

All 126 seats to the National Consultative Assembly
	First party	Second party	Third party
Party	Moderate Socialists Party	Democrat Party	Union and Progress Party
Seats won	36	28	4
	Fourth party	Fifth party
Party	Southern Progressives	Independent
Seats won	2≈4	55
Prime Minister before election
Vacant
Elected Prime Minister
Mohammad Vali Khan Tonekaboni
Moderate Socialists Party

Parliamentary elections were held for the second time in Persia in 1909. The new Parliament convened on 19 November. The majority of the parliament was held by a some 53-seats coalition pioneered by Moderate Socialists Party.
