= Socialist Party (Iran) =

- Leader: Soleiman Eskandari
- Founded: 1921
- Banned: 1926
- Headquarters: Tehran, Iran
- Newspaper: Tofan
- Women's wing: Patriotic Women's Society
- Ideology: Socialism
- Political position: Left-wing

The Socialist Party (Persian: حزب سوسیالیست, romanized: Ḥezb-e Sosyâlist) was a leading left-wing political party active in Iran during the 1920s.

A minor group of the same name appeared for a while in the 1940s.

== Development ==
The roots of the Socialist Party lay in the Democrat Party, a reformist group active in the first two decades of the twentieth century. Following the disintegration of this movement those members who retained faith in the masses and hoped to mobilise the lower and middle classes grouped together under the Socialist Party banner in 1921.

The party was led by Sulayman Eskandari, Muhammad Musavat and Qasim Khan Sur as well as Muhammad Sadiq Tabatabai, a member of a leading clerical family recruited largely to hold off the inevitable attacks from conservative clerics. Their main newspaper, Toufan (Storm), was edited by the outspoken and controversial poet Mohammad Farrokhi Yazdi.

Branches were set up in Rasht, Qazvin, Bandar Anzali, Tabriz, Mashhad, Kerman and Kermanshah although Tehran was the main base of operations and it was in the capital that the party founded four newspapers and established affiliated groups such as the Union of Employees in the Ministry of Post and Telegraph, a Tenants Association and Patriotic Women's Society. The latter group campaigned for a wider role for women in Iranian society, promoting such initiatives as education for girls and wider provisions for women's health. It had been established in 1922 by Mohtaram Eskandari and quickly affiliated to her husband's party.

The party's programme called for the eventual establishment of equality in society, nationalisation of the means of production, irrigation schemes, a new level of regional government, a free and equal judiciary, the rights of free speech, free assembly and trade union rights, free elections, wider access to education, improved working conditions including an end to child labour and government intervention against unemployment. The party gained some support, attracting 2500 members in Tehran alone soon after its formation.

== Reza Khan ==
Along with the Reformist Party, the Revival Party and the Communist Party the Socialist Party was one of the four groups courted by Rezā Shāh as he made his play for the throne of Persia.

Along with the Revival Party it formed a working majority in the Iranian parliament that allowed Reza Khan, as he was still known, he form his own reformist government. Khan soon broke from the Socialists and threw in his lot with more conservative elements when he decided to abandon plans for a republic and instead establish himself as king. 134 The part was one of the few in parliament not to actively support Reza's rise to the throne, arguing that despite their support for many of his reforms their republican principles prevented them from endorsing him as a monarch.

Following Rezā Shāh's ascension to the throne the Socialist Party disappeared as part of a wider crackdown on anti-monarchist dissent. Iskandari was forced to retire from public life and mobs were organised to harass the party and attack their properties. A Socialist Theatre in Enzeli was razed to the ground by a police-led mob on the pretext that during a performance of Tartuffe a female actor had been on stage whilst in Tehran the Patriotic Women's Society was stoned and their library burnt down.

== Revived name ==
A second group calling itself the Socialist Party emerged in 1944 when radical members of the Comrades Party broke from that group over its failure to support striking workers in Isfahan. Close to the Tudeh Party of Iran it joined the Tudeh-led United Front of Progressive Parties in 1946 and was effectively absorbed by the larger group.

== Sources ==
- Abrahamian, Ervand (1982). Iran Between Two Revolutions. Princeton Studies on the Near East. Princeton, New Jersey: Princeton University Press. ISBN 0691101345.
