= Democrat Party (Persia) =

Democrat Party فرقه دموکرات
- Leader: Soleiman Eskandari
- Parliamentary leader: Hassan Taqizadeh
- Executive secretary: Haydar Khan Amo-oghli
- Founded: 1909
- Dissolved: 1919 or 1921
- Preceded by: Social Democratic Party
- Headquarters: Tehran, Persia
- Newspaper: Iran-e No; Nobahar; Iran; Zaban-e Azad
- Ideology: Social democracy; Radicalism; Progressivism; Nationalism; Secularism; Constitutionalism
- Political position: Centre-left

The Democrat Party (Persian: فرقه دموکرات) was a social democratic political party in Qajari Persia, during the constitutional period. It was one of two major parliamentary parties at the time, along with the Moderate Socialists Party. It was largely composed of middle-class intellectuals and stood for the separation of church and state.

== History ==
Initially an offshoot of the Transcaucasia-based Social Democratic Party, it severed direct ties with Baku and dropped "Social" from the name in deference to the conservative public. Its ideology, however, remained heavily borrowed from the old party.

In 1918, the party split definitively into the Pro-Reorganization Democrats (Persian: دموکرات‌های تشکیلی, romanized: Demokrāthā-ye taškīlī) led by Bahar; and the Anti-Reorganization Democrats (Persian: دموکرات‌های ضدتشکیلی, romanized: Demokrāthā-ye żedd-e taškīlī).

== Parliament election results ==
Election	Seats				Quota
Election	Count	±	%	±	Quota
1906	21 / 156	—N/a	13.46	—N/a	Minority as Social Democratic Party
1909	28 / 126	▲7	22.22	▲8.76	Minority
1914	51 / 115	▲23	44.34	▲22.12	Majority party Including 20 in coalition
