= Revival Party =

- Succeeded by: New Iran Party
- Ideology: Progressivism; Liberalism; Nationalism; Reformism; Secularism

Revival Party or Modernity Party (Persian: حزب تجدد, romanized: Ḥezb-e Taǰaddod) was a secular progressive political party in Persia/Iran during the 1920s. The party also had liberal and nationalist tendencies and supported Reza Khan become the new Shah of Iran while holding majority in the parliament.

Formed by young western-educated reformists, it was mainly organized by Ali Akbar Davar, Mohammad Tadayon and Abdolhossein Teymourtash, and was led by former Democrat Party politicians who had lost confidence in the masses, in contrast to the Socialist Party which was led by former Democrats who retained hope to mobilize lower classes.

Many constitutionalist veterans were associated with the party, including Mohammad Ali Foroughi, Mostowfi ol-Mamalek, Hassan Taqizadeh, Mohammad-Taqi Bahar and Ebrahim Hakimi.

The party's platform was based on "separation of religion and politics, creating a strong army, an efficient administrative system, to end the economic rates, industrialize Iran, instead of replacing domestic investment of foreign capital into the agricultural tribes, development of the income tax system, educational facilities to the public, including women, opportunities for the flourishing of talents, and throughout the promotion of Persian language instead of local languages".
