= Ahmadiyeh =

Ahmadiyeh (Persian: احمديه) may refer to:

- Ahmadiyeh, Hamadan
- Ahmadiyeh, Fahraj, Kerman Province
- Ahmadiyeh, Rafsanjan, Kerman Province
- Ahmadiyeh, Khuzestan
- Ahmadiyeh, Razavi Khorasan
- Ahmadiyeh, South Khorasan

== See also ==
- Ahmadiyya (disambiguation)
