= Ahmadi (disambiguation) =

Ahmadis are either members of the Ahmadiyya Muslim Jama'at (an Islamic messianic movement based on Sunni Islam) or members of the Ahmadi Religion of Peace and Light (a new religious movement based on Twelver Shi'a Islam).

Ahmadi may also refer to:

== Places ==
=== Iran ===
- Ahmadi, Bushehr
- Ahmadi, East Azerbaijan
- Ahmadi, Hamadan
- Ahmadi, Hormozgan
- Ahmadi, Hajjiabad, Hormozgan Province
  - Ahmadi District, in Hormozgan Province
  - Ahmadi Rural District, in Hormozgan Province
- Ahmadi, Kuhbanan, Kerman Province
- Ahmadi, Rafsanjan, Kerman Province
- Ahmadi, Zarand, Kerman Province
- Ahmadi, Khuzestan

=== Elsewhere ===
- Amadiya, an ancient hilltop city in Iraq
- Al Ahmadi, Kuwait, a city in Kuwait
- Al-Ahmadiyah, former Syrian village in the Golan

== Other uses ==
- Ahmadiyya (disambiguation)
- Ahmad (disambiguation)
- Ahmadi (surname)
