= Teymourtash (surname) =

Teymourtash also Teymurtash is a surname used in Iran, and may refer to:

- Abdolhossein Teymourtash (1883–1933), Persian diplomat and politician
- Badri Teymourtash (1911–1989), first female dentist in Iran
- Iran Teymourtash (1914–1991), woman activist in Iran
