= Ahmadi (surname) =

Ahmadi (Persian: احمدی) is an Iranian surname. Notable people with the surname include:

- Ahmad Ahmadi (1885–1944), Iranian nurse
- Ahmad Ahmadi (philosopher) (1933–2018), Iranian scholar, philosopher and politician
- Ahmad Ahmadi (sailor) (born 1990), Iranian professional sailor
- Ahmadreza Ahmadi (1940–2023), Iranian poet and screenwriter
- Farida Ahmadi (born 1957), Afghan author, speaker and women's rights activist
- Latif Ahmadi (born 1950), Afghan film director
- Masoud Ahmadi Moghaddasi (1963–2005), Iranian judge
- Mehdi Ahmadi (1966–2026), Iranian painter, film actor and artist
- Morteza Ahmadi (1924–2014), Iranian actor, singer, and writer
- Noushin Ahmadi Khorasani, Iranian author, translator, essayist, journalist and activist
- Parastoo Ahmadi ( born 1997), Iranian singer sentenced to 74 lashes
- Rahman Ahmadi (born 1980), Iranian goalkeeper and coach
- Shiva Ahmadi (born 1975), Iranian-American artist
- Zahra Ahmadi (born 1982), British actress

== See also ==
- Ahmady, a surname
- Ahmedi (surname)
