= Ahmadiyya (disambiguation) =

Ahmadiyya is a messianic and revivalist movement within Islam.

Ahmadiyya may also refer to:

- Ahmadiyya Caliphate, main leadership of the Ahmadiyya movement
- Ahmadiyya school (disambiguation)
- Mosque-Madrasa of al-Ahmadiyya, mosque in Baghdad

== See also ==
- Ahmadi (disambiguation)
- Ahmadiyeh (disambiguation)
