= Ahmady =

Ahmady is a surname of Arabic origins, meaning "descended from or associated with Ạhmad". People with this surname include:

- Ahmad Jan Ahmady (born 1974), director of the Administrative Office of the President of the Islamic Emirate of Afghanistan
- Ajmal Ahmady (born 1978), Afghan-American economist and politician
- Kameel Ahmady, Iranian-born British scholar working in the field of social anthropology, of Kurdish descent
- Leeza Ahmady (born 1972), Afghan-born American independent curator, author, arts administrator, dance instructor, and educator.
- Waleed El Ahmady, Egyptian bridge player

== See also ==
- Ahmadi (disambiguation)
- Ahmad (disambiguation)
