= Ahmad (disambiguation) =

Ahmad, or variants, is a given name and surname.

Ahmad may also refer to:

- Ahmad, Iran, or Ahmad, a village
- Ahmad (crater), on Saturn's moon Enceladus
- Ahmad (horse), an Argentine Thoroughbred racehorse
- Ahmad (rapper), an American rapper
  - Ahmad (album), by Ahmad, 1994
- Ahmed (Sholay), a fictional character portrayed by Sachin Pilgaonkar in the 1975 Indian film Sholay

== See also ==
- Achmat (disambiguation), alternative spelling
- Ahmadabad (disambiguation), including Ahmedabad
- Ahmadi (disambiguation)
- Ahmady, a surname
- Ahmednagar (disambiguation)
- Ahmedpur (disambiguation)
