= Badri Teymourtash =

Iranian dentist

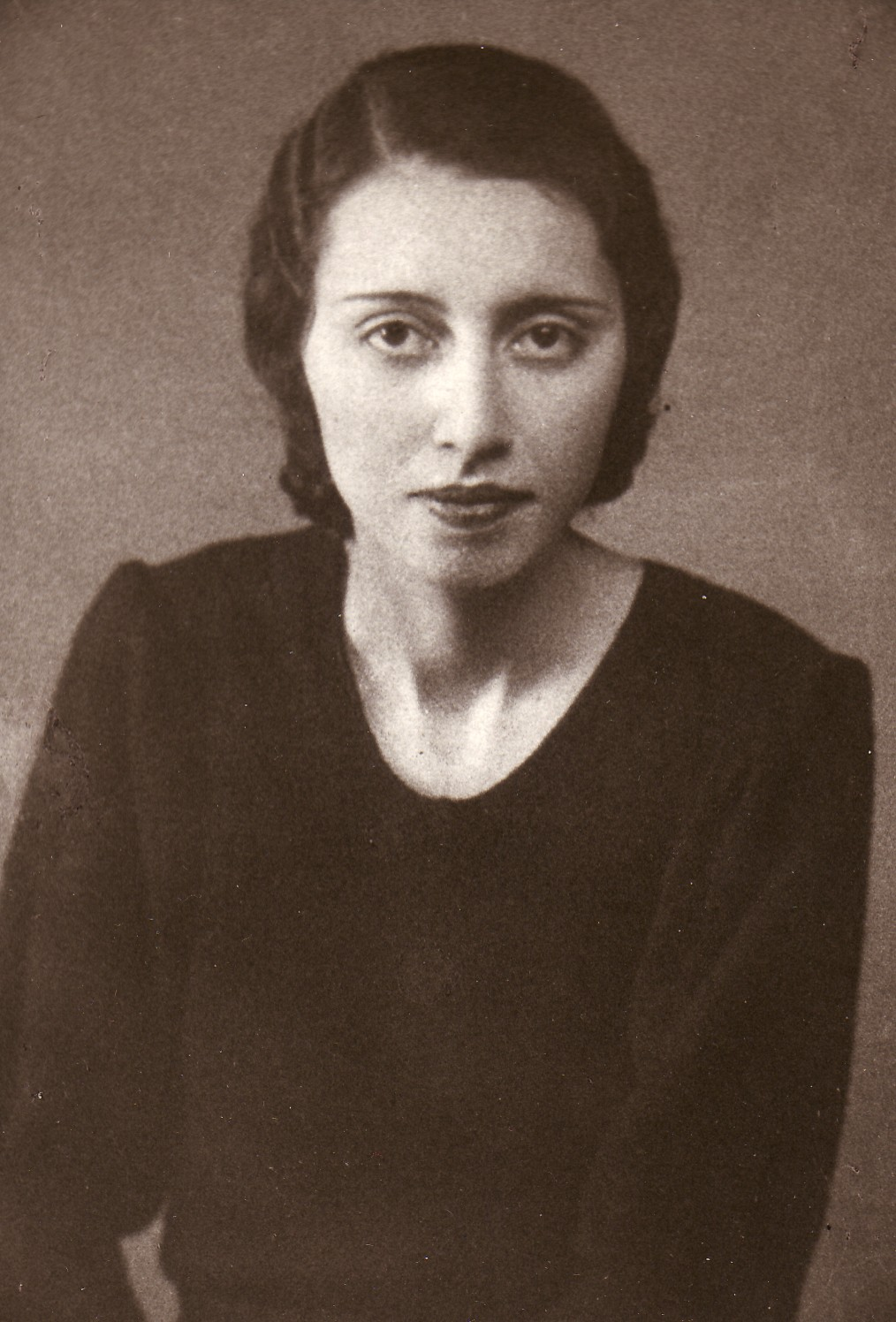
Dr. Badri Teymourtash.

Badri Teymourtash (Persian: بدری تیمورتاش; 1908–1995) (1287-1374 S.H) was the first female dentist in Iran, and is called "Mother of Dentistry" in Iran.

She was born in Kalpoosh village in Semnan region in Iran.

== Biography ==
Born to an influential Iranian family in 1908 in Mashhad, she was the sister of Iran's second most powerful political personality during the early Pahlavi dynasty, Abdolhossein Teymourtāsh. She was sent to Belgium in the late 1920s and enrolled in dental school.

Upon graduating from dental school, she is believed to have considered moving to the Belgian Congo to undertake humanitarian work. However, her brother Abdolhossein Teymourtash's fall from grace in 1932 prompted her to return to Iran where along with Teymourtash's wife and children she endured eight years of house arrest and exile to the family's farflung estates in Khorasan. Upon Reza Shah's abdication in 1941, pursuant to a general amnesty, all political prisoners were released, and Badri Teymourtash moved to Mashad where she pursued dentistry.

In 1965 she and Esmael Sondoozi founded Mashhad University’s School of Dentistry. She retired in 1989 (1368 S.H), and died in 1995. She had publications in the field of dentistry, among them, the textbook "Dahaan Pezeshki" (Oral Medicine = Les Affections de la Cavite Buccale) is so important.

She was buried in Holy Shrine (Sahne Azadi) in Mashhad. The library at Mashhad University's School of Dentistry was renamed in her honor.

== See also ==
- Abdolhossein Teymourtāsh
- Iran Teymourtash
