= Ahmedi =

Ahmedi is a surname. Notable people with the surname include:

- Taceddin Ahmedi (1334–1413), Ottoman poet
- Valon Ahmedi (born 1994), Albanian footballer

== See also ==
- Ahmadi (surname)
