= Abdolhossein Teymourtash =

Iranian statesman (1881/82–1933)

Abdolhossein Teymourtash عبدالحسین تیمورتاش
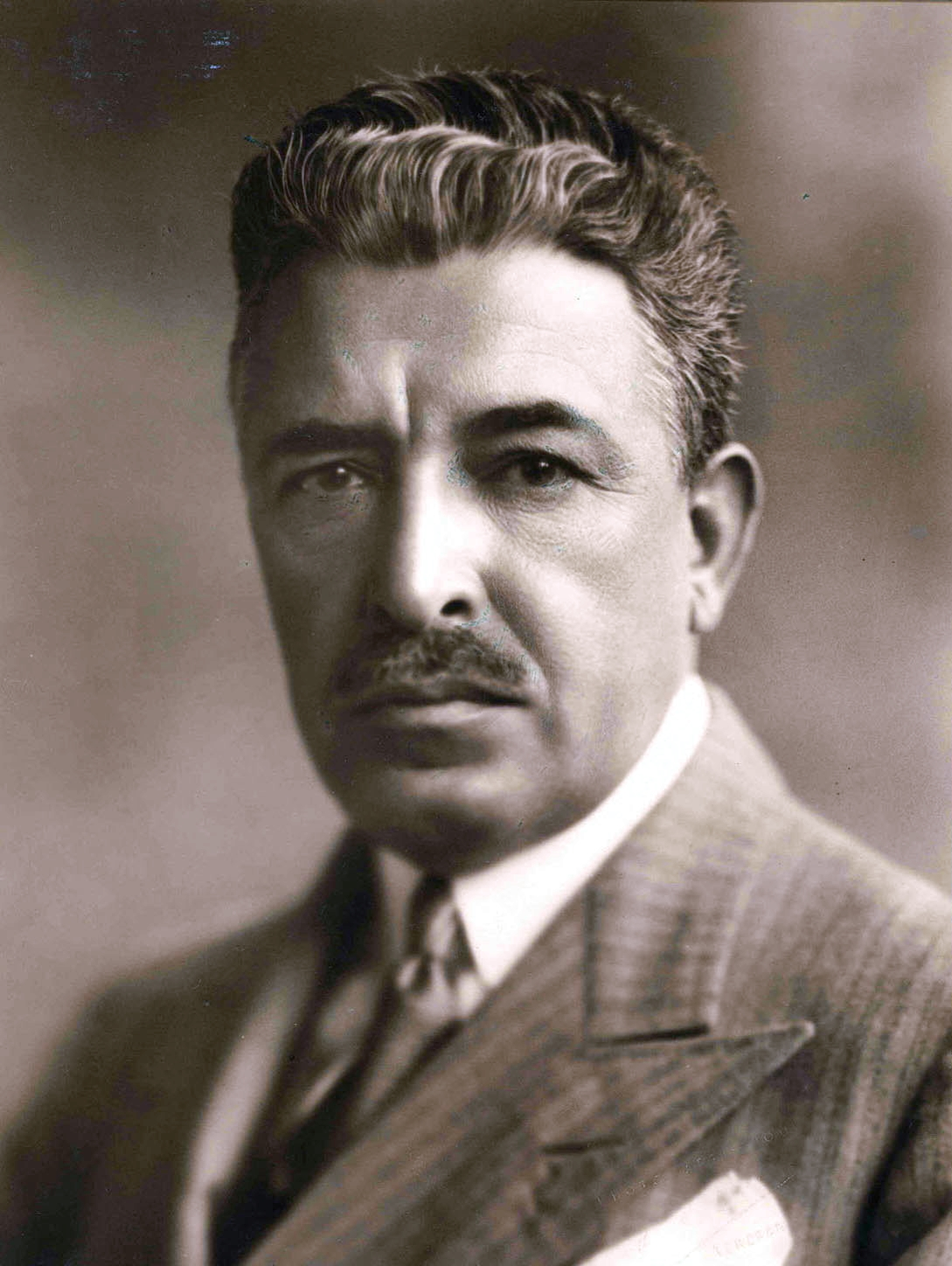

Minister of the Royal Court
- In office 11 November 1925 – 3 September 1933
- Monarch: Reza Shah
- Prime Minister: Mohammad-Ali Foroughi; Mostowfi ol-Mamalek; Mehdi Qoli Hedayat
- Preceded by: New Title
- Succeeded by: Mehdi Shoukati

Minister of Trade of Iran
- In office 28 October 1923 – 11 November 1925
- Monarch: Ahmad Shah Qajar
- Prime Minister: Reza Pahlavi
- Preceded by: Hassan Pirnia
- Succeeded by: Mehdi Qoli Hedayat

Personal details
- Born: 1881 or 1882 Bojnord, Sublime State of Iran
- Died: 3 October 1933 (51 or 52) Tehran, Imperial State of Iran
- Resting place: Imamzadeh Abdollah, Ray
- Party: Revival Party (1920–1927); New Iran Party (1927); Progress Party (1927–1932); Reformers' Party (early 1920s)
- Relatives: Amirteymour Kalali Asadollah Alam Ali Ehsassi

Abdolhossein Teymourtash (Persian: عبدالحسین تیمورتاش; 1881 or 82 – 3 October 1933) was an influential Iranian statesman who served as the first minister of the royal court of the Pahlavi dynasty from 1925 to 1932, and is credited with playing a crucial role in laying the foundations of modern Iran in the 20th century.

Given his significant role in the transition of power from the Qajar to Pahlavi dynasties, he is identified closely with the Pahlavis for whom he served as the first minister of court from 1925 to 1933. Nonetheless, Teymourtash's rise to prominence on the Iranian political scene predated the rise of Reza Shah to the throne in 1925, and his elevation to the second most powerful political position in the early Pahlavi era was preceded by a number of significant political appointments. Apart from having been elected to serve as a member of Parliament to the 2nd (1909–1911); 3rd (1914–1915); 4th (1921–1923); 5th (1924–1926); and 6th (1926–1928) Majles of Iran, Teymourtash served in the following capacities: Governor of Gilan (1919–1920); Minister of Justice (1922); Governor of Kerman (1923–1924); and Minister of Public Works (1924–1925).

As Miron Rezun noted, "possessing a pronounced western outlook on life, he is said to have been by far one of the most cultivated and educated Persians of his day". As such, apart from his significant accomplishments as one of the masterminds of the early Pahlavi era where he devised a number of fundamental bureaucratic reforms and navigated his country's foreign relations, Teymourtash has been credited with playing a significant role in shaping the intellectual and cultural currents that transformed Iran in the first half of the 20th century.

== Early years ==
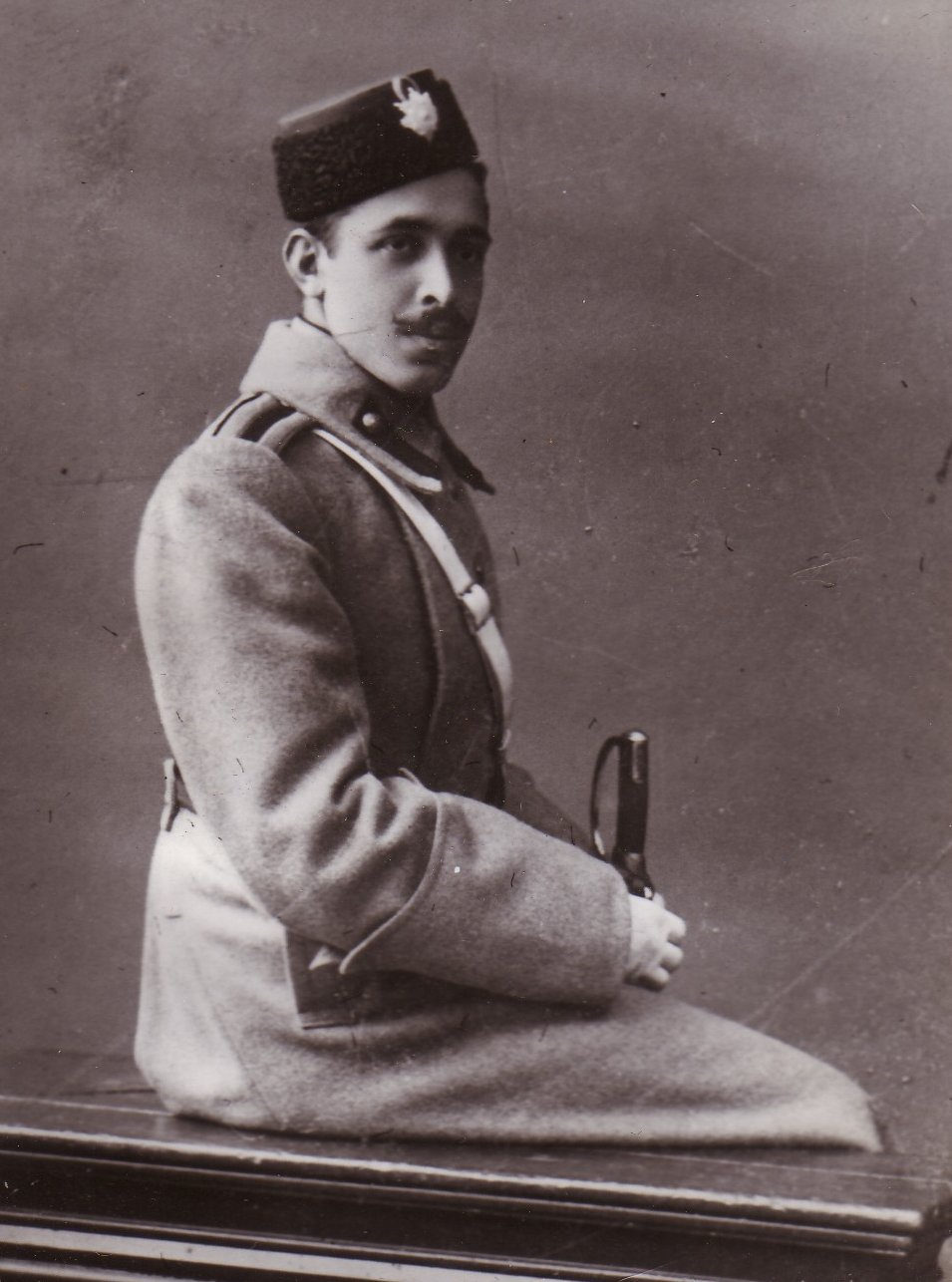
Teymourtash as a young cadet

Abdolhossein Khan Teymourtash (Sardar Moazam Khorasani) was born into a prominent family in 1881 or 1882.His father, Karimdad Khan Nardini (Moa'zes al Molk), was a major landowner with extensive landholdings in Khorasan, Iran's northern province neighbouring the then Imperial Russia's Central Asia (now Turkmenistan). To provide his son with the best educational opportunities available to affluent Iranians of the late 19th century, Teymourtash's father dispatched him at the age of 11 to Tsarist Russia to receive a formal education.

After enrolling for a year of preparatory school in Ashgabat, Teymourtash was sent to Saint Petersburg to pursue further studies. He was enrolled as a cavalry cadet at the venerated Imperial Nicholas Military Academy, a preserve of the sons of the Russian aristocracy. The curriculum of the school was predominated mainly by military and administrative studies, but also allowed Teymourtash to adopt a fluent command of Russian, French and German, as well as familiarity with English. Teymourtash's eleven-year stay in Russia also led him to develop a lifelong passion for Russian and French literature, leading him to be the first Iranian to translate into Persian the masterful Russian literary works of Lermontov and Turgenev upon his return to Iran.

== Return to Iran ==
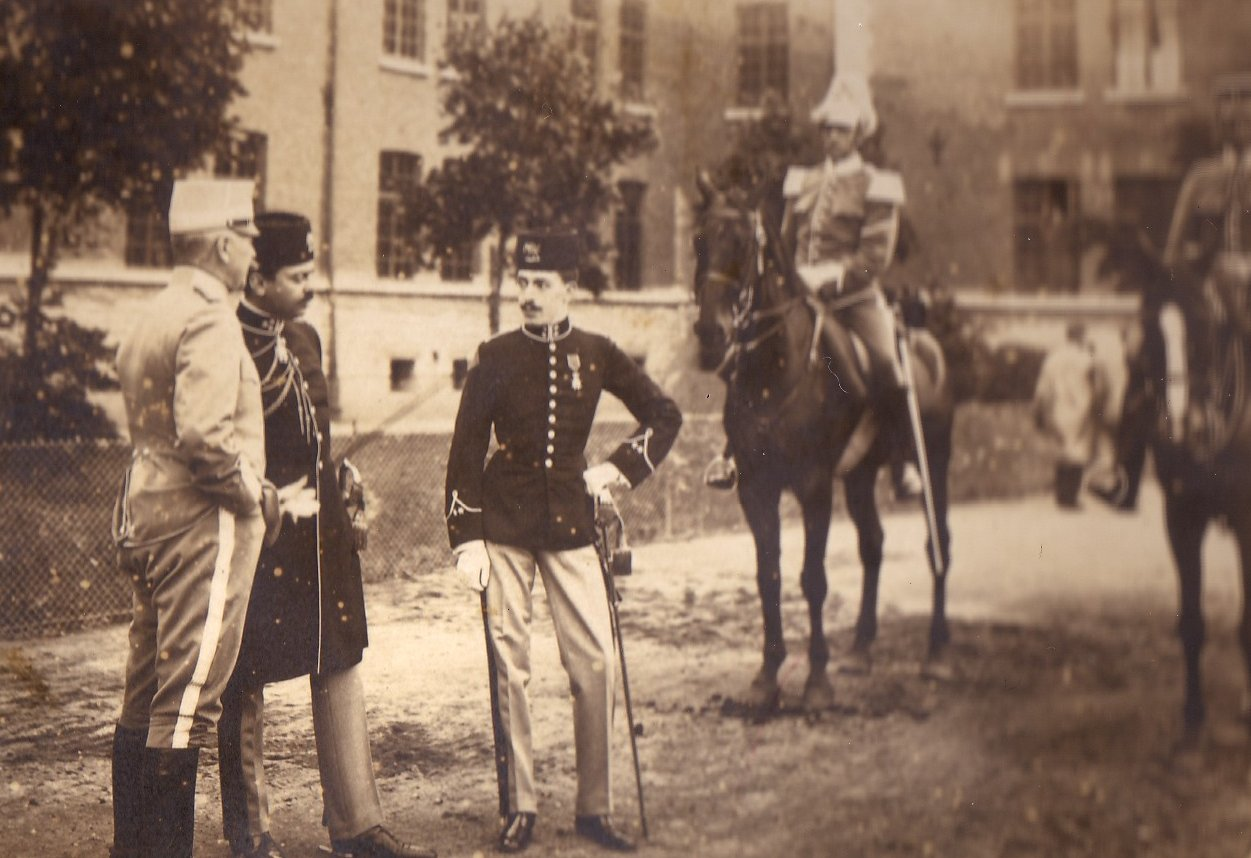
Teymourtash visiting Europe to inform European capitals of ascendancy of a new Shah in Iran (1907)

Teymourtash visiting Europe as member of an Iranian delegation informing European capitals of the ascendancy of a new Shah (1907)

Given his extensive absence from Iran, one of the first tasks Teymourtash set for himself upon returning to his native Iran was to retire to the seclusion of his family estates with the task of improving his Persian. With the help of a tutor, he spent approximately the first six months upon his return to Iran to perfecting his native linguistic skills and devouring Persian poetry and literary masterpieces. His discipline and foresight during the period would serve him well, leading him, in due course, to be described as Iran's most gifted orator in its modern parliamentary experience. Another fortuitous development during the early years of his return to Iran was his marriage to Sorour ol Saltaneh, the niece of the regent, Azod al Molk, and a relative of the governor of Khorasan, Nayer al Dowleh. To congratulate the new couple on their wedding, the reigning Qajar Shah of the period bestowed the title Sardar Moazzam Khorasani on the young groom.

Teymourtash's first employment upon returning to Iran was with the Ministry of Foreign Affairs, where he served as a minor bureaucrat while acting as a Russian translator. Shortly thereafter, Teymourtash's father's connections to the court proved decisive and the 24‑year‑old was appointed a member of a newly constituted delegation mandated to visit several European capitals to herald the inauguration of a new shah to the throne, Mohammad Ali Shah Qajar.

== Constitutional revolution ==
As Essad Bey, an early chronicler of Teymourtash's life was to note in the 1930s, "unlike other Iranians of aristocratic houses, young Teymourtash brought back from Europe more than just an affection for occidental garb and an inclination for Persian nightclubs. Because old Persia offered no future for a man of such military training as he had received in Saint Petersburg, he decided to dedicate himself to politics".

Just as the last year of Teymourtash's stay in St. Petersburg coincided with the uprisings and revolts that would culminate in the Russian Revolution of 1905, Iran was soon to find itself in the convulsive throes of the Iranian Constitutional Revolution.

Despite his father's staunch royalist tendencies and his ties to the royal court, young Teymourtash became an active member of the constitutional society headed by Malik al-Mutakallimin in Khorasan. While the rank and file of this particular society consisted mainly of lesser tradesman and poorer people, and included amongst its active membership few educated notables, Teymourtash demonstrated his progressive tendencies by developing a strong affinity for the constitutional ideals and thrust of this gathering and assumed a leading role in the group.

Teymourtash's active involvement in constitutional gatherings led, in due course, to his appointment as chief of staff of the populist constitutionalist forces resisting the reigning monarch's decision to storm the buildings of Parliament. The constitutionalists forces eventually took sanctuary in Parliament to demand constitutionally entrenched rights and safeguards. Throughout the period, Teymourtash remained directly involved by training members of the constitutionalist volunteer militia, and demonstrated bravery when clashes took place with the better trained and more numerous royalist forces. Despite the staunch efforts of the constitutionalists, the royalist forces prevailed by storming Parliament and dissolving the National Assembly.

Teymourtash in the 1920s

== Election to Parliament and early political life ==
The following year when nationwide elections were held for the second Majlis of Iran, Teymourtash was elected the youngest Member of Parliament at the age of 26 from Neishabour, in his native Province of Khorasan. In subsequent elections he was re-elected as a deputy to the 3rd (1914–1915), 4th (1921–1923), 5th (1924–1926) and 6th (1926–1928) National Assemblies. However, given the sporadic convening of the Iranian Parliament, Teymourtash accepted a number of political appointments during the long intervening stretches between the dissolution of each session of Parliament and the reconvening of the next.

Although Iran remained a non-belligerent during World War I, it suffered more economic devastation than any other neutral country during the period. Nonetheless, in 1918, the new Soviet Government renounced all previous concessions granted by Iran to Tsarist Russia. Intent on capitalizing on the military withdrawal of Soviet troops from Iran, and the attendant decision by the Soviet authorities to diminish their political interference in its domestic affairs, the United Kingdom decided that the time was ripe to consolidate its de facto control of Iran. To accomplish such an objective, the British set out to prevail upon the Iranian Government that it should cede financial, military and diplomatic authority in return for much needed financial and military assistance. The British succeeded in their design by offering the then Iranian Prime Minister, and its Ministers of Finance and Foreign Affairs, sizeable bribes to ensure that they would acquiesce to the British demand to devise a virtual protectorate over Iran. It was agreed that neither the bribes nor the terms of the Agreement would be made public, and that the scheme would be portrayed as a necessity to forestall the chaos that had enveloped Iran in the aftermath of the devastating impact of the war.

However, the secrecy shrouding the negotiation of the 1919 Agreement, and the failure to summon Parliament to ratify it prompted nationalist politicians to seize the opportunity to galvanize public opposition to the agreement. Recognizing the brewing controversy, the Government of Iran on advice of the British Government refrained from reconvening Parliament which it was assumed would refuse to ratify the Agreement. At this juncture, Teymourtash emerged as one of the main politicians to voice early opposition to the agreement by co-authoring a general proclamation signed by 41 members of parliament referred to as the "Statement of Truth" which denounced the Agreement of 1919. The proclamation proved effective in consolidating popular opposition against the Agreement, leading the British Government to eventually abandon the scheme altogether.

Teymourtash served as the governor of Gilan from 1919 to 1920. His governorship of Gilan was to prove particularly noteworthy given the reality that his primary mandate was to counter secessionist forces in that province led by Mirza Kuchak Khan who received assistance from the new Bolshevik Government in the neighbouring Soviet Union. Teymourtash's term as Governor of Gilan was to prove short-lived, lasting less than a year, after which he was recalled to the capital without the balance of power between central government forces and those of the Soviet-backed insurgents having shifted in any particular direction. Some Iranian historians have accused Teymourtash of having used undue force in resisting the secessionists, but records that could corroborate such an account have not been presented. He may have been appointed civilian governor, but at the same time a Cossack officer, Starosselsky, had been appointed military governor with unfettered powers to quell the jangali successionist movement. In fact, Mirza Kuchak Khan's followers put on trial during Teymourtash's term were court martialed by a five-member tribunal consisting entirely of Cossack officers.

A Soviet Republic of Gilan was declared in June 1920, after Teymourtash's return to Tehran, lasting until October 1921. Given Teymourtash's concern with protecting the territorial integrity of Iran from the secessionist troops led by Mirza Kuchak Khan, upon his recall to Tehran, along with Seyyed Zia'eddin Tabatabaee, he approached the British legation in the capital to solicit their support to resist the insurgents in the North. In return for British financial assistance, Teymourtash proposed an arrangement whereby he would assume personal command of troops to repel advances made by Mirza Kuchak Khan and his supporters. Although the British legation in Tehran seemed favourably impressed with the plan, officials in the British foreign office at Whitehall refused to approve the proposal due to financial considerations.

On 21 February 1921, a group of Anglophile political activists led by Seyyed Zia'eddin Tabatabaee, the rising young journalist, succeeded in plotting a coup that toppled the Iranian Government, while vowing to preserve the Qajar monarchy. The military strongman commanding the Persian Cossack Brigade that descended on Tehran was to be Reza Khan. Reza Khan had successfully consolidated his hold over this cavalry unit when its Tsarist commanding officers departed Iran due to the revolutionary upheaval and the ensuing Civil War that engulfed their country. While the Coup lasted approximately 100 days, it proved to be the stepping stone allowing Reza Khan to consolidate his power and, in due course, to ascend to the throne several years later. Although, according to the British archives, Seyyed Zia'eddin Tabatabaee offered Teymourtash a cabinet portfolio, Teymourtash refused to join the former's government. In the aftermath of the coup a number of Iranian political notables, including Teymourtash, were imprisoned to forestall opposition. Teymourtash was not initially singled out as one of the members of Parliament to be incarcerated. The decision to have him arrested followed an exchange he had with one of the British diplomats in Tehran at an official function whereby he publicly accused the British Government of having masterminded the putsch led by Sayyad Zia and Reza Khan. After being briefly held in prison, Teymourtash was exiled to Qom where he was held until the coup collapsed several months later.

Soon after being released, Teymourtash returned to Tehran and was appointed Minister of Justice in the cabinet of Hassan Pirnia ("Moshir od-Dowleh"), with a mandate to initiate the process of modernizing the court system in Iran based on the French judicial model. However, the collapse of the Government shortly thereafter prevented Teymourtash from fundamentally restructuring the Iranian judicial system. Nonetheless, during his brief term as Minister of Justice, he succeeded in securing parliamentary approval to suspend the operation of certain courts and administrative bodies, and dismissed judges and magistrates deemed grossly incompetent. Moreover, given the necessity of expanding the purview of the secular judiciary, state courts were granted partial appellate jurisdiction over religious courts during Teymourtash's term as Minister of Justice. He resigned from Parliament for the balance of its term and served as Governor of Kerman for the following year and a half.

With the advent of a new government, Teymourtash was once again summoned to join Cabinet as the Minister of Public Works. Among his most notable accomplishments in his capacity as Minister of Public works in 1924 made the far reaching decision to draft a detailed proposal to the Iranian Parliament in 1924 introducing a tax on tea and sugar to finance the construction of a Trans-Iranian Railway, a project which was ultimately completed twelve years later in 1937. The economic merits of such a financing scheme would allow Iran to complete the construction of the Trans-Iranian Railway in 1937 by relying entirely on local capital.

Another significant initiative introduced by Teymourtash during his tenure as the Minister of Public Works was the introduction of legislation annulling the French monopoly concession for excavating antiquities in Iran in a bid to usher in an open door policy whereby excavators from other countries could assist in unearthing Iranian national treasures and antiquities. As Murray, the American Minister to Tehran noted at the time, "Meanwhile the indefatigable Sardar Moazzam, Minister of Public Works, has introduced to the Medjliss his bill which proposes the abrogation of all Imperial firmans and concessions obtained thereby, which will of course include that held by the French". Although the bill was originally conceived and drafted while Teymourtash served as Minister of Public Works, it finally secured passage through the Majles in 1927.

During the 1920s, alongside his varied political engagements, Teymourtash also devoted considerable time to literary and cultural pursuits. Given his longstanding acquaintance with many of Iran's leading intellectuals and writers, he joined the editorial board of Daneshkadeh, a periodical established by Mohammad Taghi Bahar ("Malekol Sho'ara"), one of Iran's leading intellectual luminaries. As revealed by Saeed Naficy (or Nafisi), one of the other distinguished members of the editorial board of Daneshkadeh, Teymourtash contributed extensively to this publication by drafting multiple articles, as well as translating various articles originating in European journals. However, the reality that these articles were penned under the pseudonym "S.M. Khorasani", would unfortunately lead Teymourtash's literary talents to escape the attention of future Iranian academics. Teymourtash's abiding interest in literature would in fact lead him to advocate in favour of securing government funds to allow Allameh Ghazvini to undertake an elaborate project to copy old Persian manuscripts available in European library collections. The funding permitted Allameh Ghazvini to spend many years visiting libraries in London, Paris, Leningrad, Berlin, and Cairo where he secured copies of rare manuscripts which he subsequently forwarded to Tehran to be used by Iranian scholars. In other instances, Teymourtash used his political influence to assist intellectuals and writers such as his interventions to ensure that the renowned historian Ahmad Kasravi would be spared harassment by the government apparatus while undertaking research, and his success in securing a seat for noted poet Mohammad Taghi Bahar to the 5th Majles from Bojnourd district which he had himself previously represented. Furthermore, he is known to have successfully interceded with Reza Shah on behalf of journalist Mirza Mohammad Farrokhi Yazdi to ensure the latter would be spared harm should he return to Iran from Germany after he had authored articles critical of the Shah while residing abroad. Upon returning to Iran in 1932, Mirza Mohammad Farrokhi Yazdi remained immune from government harassment for several years, although he was subsequently indicted in 1935 several years after Teymourtash's fall from grace.

Teymourtash's voracious intellectual appetite led him to assemble one of the most extensive private library collections in Iran. No effort was spared in this endeavour, and Teymourtash was recognized as one of the country's most generous patrons of literary works and Persian calligraphy. Among the many works he commissioned, a notable example was the Testament of Ardashir into Persian. Indeed, the title page of the first edition published in Tehran in 1932 would read as follows: "This unique and most important historical document is offered to his Imperial Majesty by His Excellency Mr. Teymourtash, the Minister of the Sublime Court".

Even more significant was the prescient role Teymourtash assumed by establishing the Society for National Heritage in the early 1920s. In due course, this society was joined by some of Iran's leading personalities and assumed a critical role advocating in favour of archeological discoveries, the construction of mausoleums to honour Iran's past poets, and the establishment of museums and libraries in the decades that followed. The society spurred considerable interest by western orientalists to undertake archaeological excavations in Iran, and lay the foundation for the construction of a mausoleum to honour Ferdowsi in 1934 and of Hafez in 1938, to name a few of its more notable early achievements. Teymourtash believed that the "services of Firdawsi toward preserving Iranian nationality and creating national unity must be compared to the services of Cyrus the Great". As such during a visit to Paris in 1931, Teymourtash took time out of his busy schedule to visit Exposition coloniale, while in Moscow he arranged to view Lenin's Mausoleum. The Ernst Herzfeld Archives in fact reveal that Teymourtash made some final changes to the decorative designs adorning the Ferdowsi mausoleum.

While the Society remained active for many decades that followed, there was never any mention that the initial creation of the Society was largely made possible by the personal efforts of Teymourtash. Apart from convening early meetings of the Society at his residence in the early 1920s, he spared no effort to solicit and engage the interest of Iran's leading political and educational elites, such as two of the earliest recruits, Isa Sadiq and Arbab Keikhosrow Shahrokh.

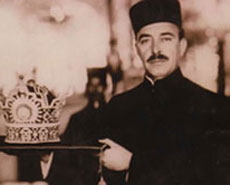
Teymourtash holding the Pahlavi Crown.

== Appointed Minister of Court ==
It was Teymourtash's appointment as Minister of Court in 1925 that proved invaluable in allowing him to demonstrate his prowess as a formidable administrator, and to establish his reputation as an indefatigable statesman intent on successfully laying the foundations of modern Iran. In this capacity, Teymourtash assumed the powers of a Grand Vizier in all but name, a position that allowed its occupant to dominate the affairs of state within previous Iranian dynasties. The dominant position of Teymourtash, and the attendant privileges enjoyed by him, were described as follows in a cable drafted by Clive, the British diplomat in Tehran, to Whitehall in 1928:

"As Minister of the Court he has acquired the position of the Shah's most intimate political adviser. His influence is ubiquitous, and his power exceeds that of the Prime Minister. He attends all meetings of the Council of Ministers, and one might compare his position with that of Reich Chancellor, except that he has no direct responsibility."

Although the appointment of Teymourtash as Reza Shah's first Minister of Court proved an inspired selection, it came as a surprise to members of the political establishment in Tehran. The capital's chattering classes were surprised that Reza Shah had not opted for one of his Persian Cossack Brigade colleagues who had accompanied him on his many military campaigns or that he did not appoint another individual with whom he had shared a more intimate or lengthy acquaintance. However, it can be assumed that Reza Shah was favourably impressed by Teymourtash's legislative maneuvers during meetings of the constituent assembly that voted overwhelmingly in favour of the deposition of the Qajar dynasty. It was, after all, primarily the collaboration between Ali Akbar Davar and Teymourtash that had led to the drafting of the Inqiraz bill which was adopted by the Majlis by a vote of 80–5 on 31 October 1925 that paved the way for Reza Shah to assume the throne. Moreover, in the period following the Coup of 1921, Teymourtash had been instrumental in successfully navigating legislation through the Iranian parliament whereby it became possible for Reza Khan to assume full jurisdiction over Iran's defence apparatus in his capacity as Commander in Chief.

Apart from appreciating Teymourtash's strong grasp of the parliamentary and legislative process, it is likely that the decision to appoint him as his first Minister of Court was animated by Reza Shah's keen interest in selecting an urbane individual familiar with diplomatic protocol who could impress foreign capitals, as well as an energetic and workaholic reformer capable of introducing discipline to the administration of government.

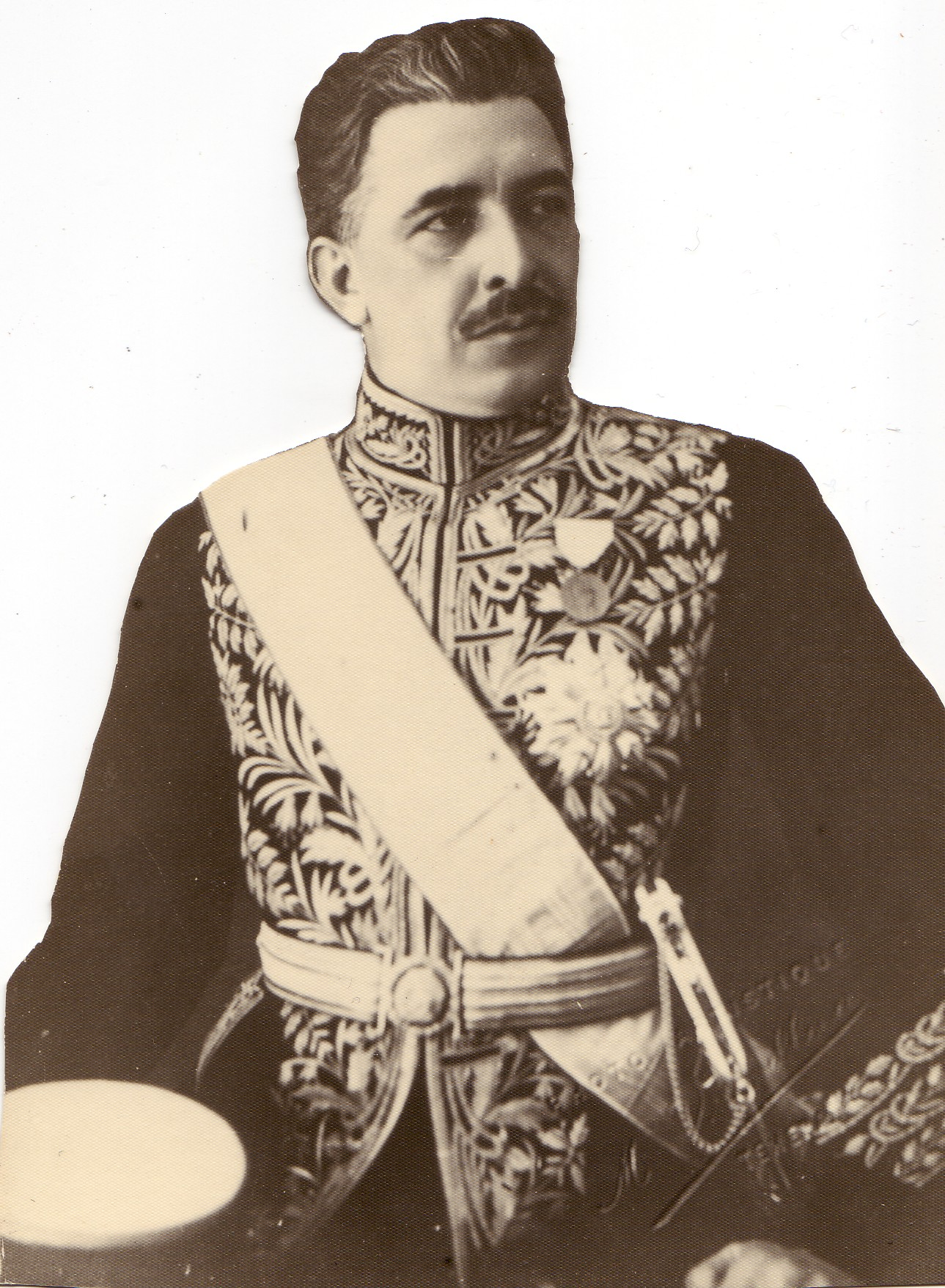
Teymourtash in official court uniform.

Lacking any semblance of a formal education, the new Reza Shah maintained his firm grip over all matters pertaining to the army and internal security, while Teymourtash was left a free hand to devise blueprints for modernizing the country, orchestrating the political implementation of much needed bureaucratic reforms, and acting as the principal steward of its foreign relations. Such a division of responsibilities would bode well for Iran given the increased vigour which would characterise its diplomacy on a host of issues in the coming years. As an American diplomat familiar with the personalities of Reza Shah and Teymourtash was to note in 1933, after the latter was relieved of his duties by the former, "In contrast to his former right hand man, the Shah is untutored, irascible, ruthless, and totally lacking in cosmopolitanism or knowledge of the world."

As many contemporaries have corroborated, in 1926 Reza Shah informed members of his Cabinet that "Teymourtash's word is my word", and for the first seven years of his reign, Teymourtash "became virtually the Shah's alter ego". T.L. Jacks of the Anglo-Persian Oil Company (APOC) believed Teymourtash to be "the mouthpiece of the Shah". While Teymourtash, in his capacity as Minister of Court was not officially a member of the Council of Ministers, his secure position at the pinnacle in effect led Prime Ministers to act as mere figureheads and the cabinet to assume a mostly decorative function. A review of the diplomatic correspondence emanating from Iran amply highlights the extent to which Teymourtash played a critical role in ensuring that the machinery of government ran smoothly. In 1926 Clive, the British diplomat, wrote to London about mental malaise evident in Reza Shah by stating "his energy appears for the moment to have deserted him; his faculties have been clouded by the fumes of opium, which have distorted his judgement and induced long spells of sullen and secretive lethargy punctuated by nightmare suspicions or by spasms of impulsive rage". However, when Teymourtash returned from his diplomatic trip of several months abroad, Clive was to report back to London that Teimurtash was instrumental in jolting Reza Shah out of his lethargy.

In his capacity as Minister of Court, Teymourtash took an active hand in devising the bureaucracy, and his unrivalled command over its parts made him the most powerful man in Iranian society. He thus skilfully dictated most of the policies and supervised their progress. A report prepared by the American representative in Tehran, Murray Hart, illustrates the breadth of Teymourtash's knowledge of the various aspects of the bureaucracy:

"After my first few meetings with him I began to suspect that his brilliancy had the elements of madness. He impressed me as just too bright, this was because the man's gifts were so extraordinary as to appear unnatural. Whether it was foreign affairs, the construction of railways or highways, reforms in post and telegraphs, educational administration or finance, he, as a rule, could discuss those subjects more intelligently than the so-called competent ministers. Besides, he devised formulas for the country's economic rehabilitation, made treaties, supervised the complicated questions regarding what to do with the tribes and told the War Minister much he did not know about organizing a system of national defence. The Soviet commercial treaty and the trade monopoly laws are unmistakable monuments to his versatility."

Teymourtash was conferred the royal title of Jenab-i-Ashraf (His Highness) in September 1928.

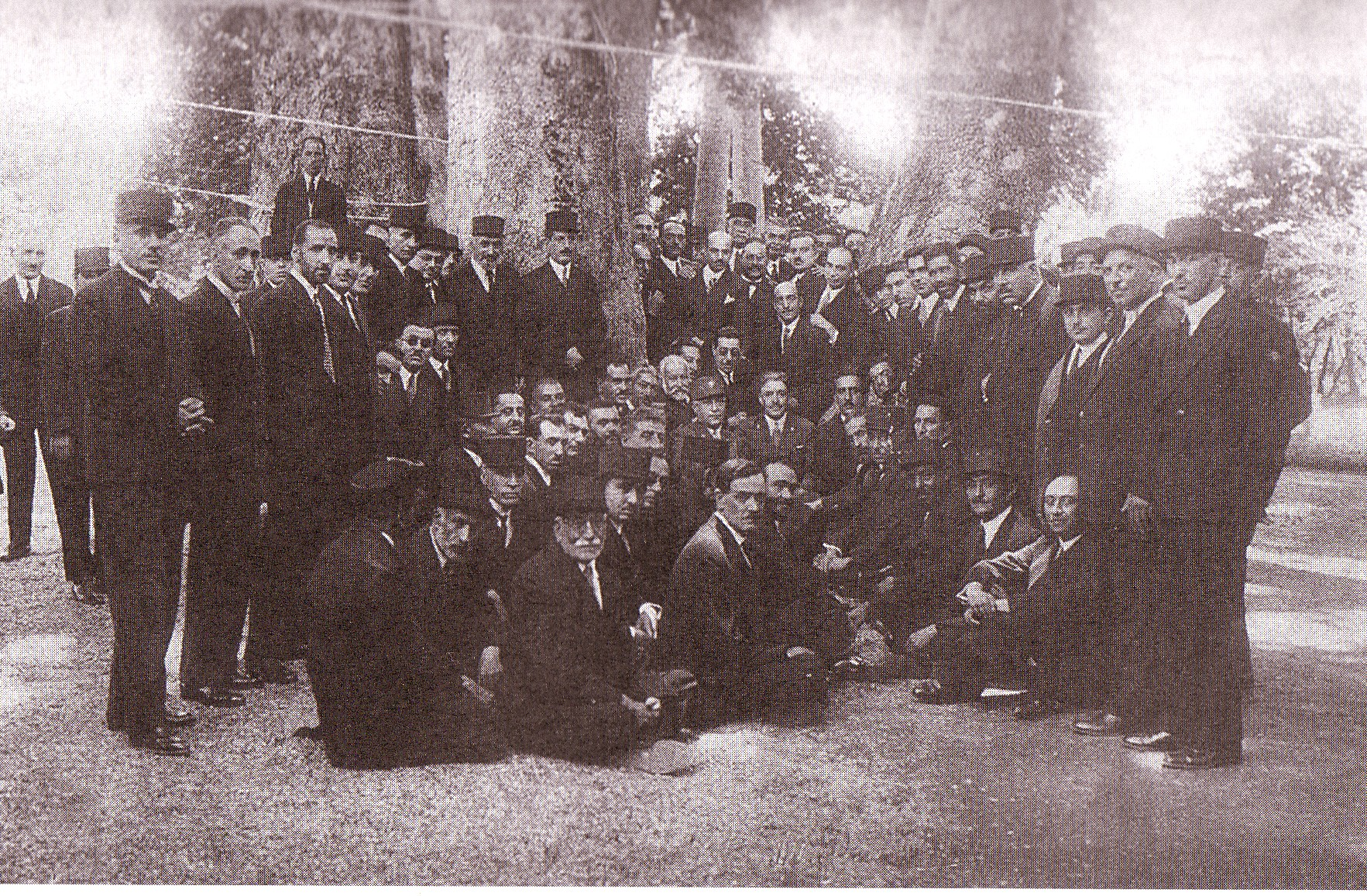
Teymourtash among deputies to the Eighth Majles.

== Domestic affairs ==
During Teymourtash's term as Minister of Court, the court ministry became the nucleus of a modern centralized bureaucracy. By all accounts Teymourtash used his position at the pinnacle to full effect by working tirelessly to ensure that the machinery of government pursued an ambitious agenda. Among the principal functions of the new Minister of Court were to mediate the relations between Reza Shah and the cabinet and parliament, and to serve as an arbiter among government institutions with overlapping responsibilities.

Most members of cabinet, including the Prime Minister, consisted of cautious and traditional administrators impervious to the need for rapid modernization or reform. The exceptions to this general rule were some of the younger, better educated and more competent members of Cabinet who displayed a more spirited inculcation, such as Firouz Mirza Nosrat-ed-Dowleh Farman Farmaian III, who became the Minister of Finance, and Ali Akbar Davar who was appointed the Minister of Justice in the early Pahlavi period. Consequently, the three formed what was to be commonly referred to as the "governing triumvirate", which began to constitute itself in the immediate aftermath of Reza Shah's coronation. While the three provided much of the intellectual and ideological inspiration for reform, it was Teymourtash who played the leading role and acted as the principal architect of the various reforms instituted during the first seven years of Reza Shah's reign.

The persistent foreign interventions of the previous decades that had brought Iran to the brink of social and economic chaos had led to the emergence of secular nationalists intent on securing the country's independence by steering clear of the previous pattern of endless compromise with foreign powers for short-term political gain. Given their aversion to Iran's centrifugal tendencies and their inclination to centralize governmental powers by creating an expanded bureaucracy, such nationalists were in favour of creating national institutions that would withstand provincial autonomous tendencies. After all, the Qajar dynasty's inability to provide a strong administrative and military apparatus had led the country to come apart at the seams with the growth of secessionist provincial movements in several provinces during the first two decades of the 20th century. The creation of a modernized central government, on the other hand, would establish the means to collect revenues and to introduce drastic reforms in the country. Another key element for such nationalists was to drastically undermine the prerogatives enjoyed by the Shia religious establishment which detracted from attempts at modernisation.

Devising diverse development projects required the creation of a large bureaucracy capable of initiating and fostering ambitious industrialization and urbanization processes capable of significantly transforming Iranian society. As such, in the first five years of the Reza Shah period, Iran developed a network of railroads that connected ports to inland cities, thereby encouraging trade between rural and urban centers.

The functioning of such a burgeoning state apparatus would require the development of increased political support by promoting drastic and far-reaching economic reforms. As such, in 1926 a new School of Commerce was created, and the government assumed the lead in establishing a Chamber of Commerce. The government also proceeded to encourage the development of private industry by offering financial incentives such as government-sanctioned monopolies and low interest loans to prospective local factory owners. In 1928 another significant step towards establishing fiscal order was taken with the establishment of the National bank ("Bank-e Melli") which assumed functions previously reserved to the British Imperial Bank. Legal reforms to strengthen property rights and to create an atmosphere conducive to commercial investment were also gradually devised, and shortly thereafter a Bar Association ("Kanoon-e Vokala") was created in 1930.

Establishing a modern educational system, as an indispensable instrument of social change, was therefore a primary objective of secular nationalist during this period. As such, one of the realms in which Teymourtash assumed a direct and principal role was in revamping Iran's educational system, and from 1925 to 1932 Education Ministers would share their authority with the powerful and influential Court Minister. By 1921, recognizing the need for creating a cadre of foreign educated professionals, the Iranian Government had sent sixty students to French military academies. With the advent of the Pahlavi era, the range of studies for government sponsored students sent abroad was extended in 1926 to encompass broader disciplines, most notably engineering. Furthermore, to adopt a more systematic approach, a bill was passed in 1928 establishing a fully state-funded program to finance the sending of 100 students a year to Europe.

Other significant initiatives of the early Pahlavi era were attempts to secularize the educational system by providing funding for state schools to gradually dominate the provision of elementary education at the expense of the traditional religious schools referred to as maktabs. This was achieved by a 1927 decree which provided free education for those unable to afford tuition fees. In the following year, inspired by the French Lycee model, a uniform curriculum was established for high schools, and the Ministry of Education began publishing academic textbooks free of charge for all needy students and at cost for others.

A concerted effort was also made to substantially increase the enrolment of females in schools. While a mere 120 girls had graduated from schools in 1926, by 1932 the number had increased substantially to 3713. Indeed, by 1930, Teymourtash's eldest daughter Iran who had recently graduated from the American Girls high school in Tehran founded an association of women with the intended goal of establishing a boarding school for destitute women. Also, during the same period Teymourtash's younger sister Badri Teymourtash was sent to Belgium and enrolled in dental studies, and upon her return was to be the first female dentist in the country. In fact by the 1960s, Dr. Badri Teymourtash, would assist in founding a school of dentistry at Mashhad University in Khorasan.

The list of domestic institutes of secondary and higher education also increased substantially during this period, although such institutions were associated and funded by various ministries. In 1927 the Faculty of Political Science from the Ministry of Foreign Affairs and the School of law of the Ministry of Justice were merged to form an independent School of Law and Political Science. Moreover, the first step in creating a bona fide university occurred in 1929 when Teymourtash officially commissioned Isa Sadiq to draft plans for the foundation of a university, which would lead to the establishment of Tehran University several years later.

Teymourtash assumed the intellectual leadership of Iranian reformists during this period, acting both as the principal initiator and executor of the many initiatives that followed. Among the shortcomings of the Iranian Parliament was that meaningful reform had been held hostage to the reality that the Majles lacked genuine political parties and the political dynamics within parliament centered around the agency of powerful men. Therefore, the Majles was composed of factions represented by ever shifting alignments and the temporary coalition of individuals created with respect to a particular issue, rather than individual members beholden to party discipline or a particular cohesive platform.

Teymourtash circa 1930

To overcome factions that undermined efforts to advance reforms required by the country, Teymourtash established a fascist political party named Iran-e Now ("The New Iran") in an attempt to introduce discipline to Iran's chaotic Parliament. Such an effort received the approval of Reza Shah and was welcomed by deputies who recognized the need for a more systematic approach to the legislative process. However, soon after being established in 1927 the Iran-Now party encountered resistance from rival politicians who cultivated the support of mullahs and other reactionary elements to form a competing Zidd-i Ajnabiha ("Anti-foreign") party. Apart from directly attacking the Iran-Now Party's secular tendencies, the Zidd-i Ajnabiha group mobilized support by attacking the legal reforms being initiated by Ali Akbar Davar, and challenged the newly initiated conscription law.

Rather than clamp down on such a challenge and the ensuing partisan bickering, Reza Shah is said to have surreptitiously supported and engaged in double dealing to support both of the competing groups. In a Machiavellian twist, Reza Shah dissolved the Iran-e Now in 1928 demonstrating that he preferred the tried-and-true and time honoured technique of relying on individuals who could be cajoled to support his whims, and demonstrating his deep suspicion even of institutions and collective bodies he himself had approved. Ironically, the failure to devise an organized political party, or to create durable institutions are generally considered to have been the greatest shortcomings of the Reza Shah period which would in turn lead to the demise of his rule in 1941.

Another initiative of Teymourtash's that proved significant was his founding of the Iran social club, which was to have significant social implications. This social club, the first of its kind in Tehran, proved a popular convening point for the social elite and the young and upwardly mobile educated members of society that formed the backbone of a burgeoning bureaucracy. It proved an ideal gathering ground for networking opportunities for individuals vying to cultivate and emulate the latest western norms of proper etiquette and social behaviour. Given its avant garde pretensions, it is not surprising that it paved the way for gaining social acceptance for the official policy of unveiling, since ministers and members of parliament appeared at the club once a week with their unveiled wives in mixed gatherings several years before such a practise was displayed on a more popular and widespread basis in other settings.

Teymourtash arriving in Moscow for diplomatic negotiations, 1926.

== Foreign affairs ==
The primary foreign policy objective pursued by Iran during the early Pahlavi era was to loosen the economic grasp of foreign powers on Iran, and in particular to mitigate the influence of Britain and the Soviet Union. While a number of individuals were appointed as Iran's Foreign Ministers, their capacity to act as the architects of the country's foreign affairs was nominal. It was the energetic Teymourtash who became the principal steward and strategist who managed Iran's foreign relations during the first seven years of the Pahlavi dynasty, a task for which he was eminently suited.

Teymourtash assumed the lead role in negotiating broadly on the widest range of treaties and commercial agreements, while Ministers ostensibly in charge of Iran's Foreign Ministry such as Mohammad Ali Foroughi and Mohammad Farzin were relegated mainly to administering official correspondence with foreign governments and assuming roles akin to the Court Minister's clerk.

Teymourtash upon being conferred France's highest civilian honour, the Legion d'honneur in Paris.

Among the first acts performed by Teymourtash in the realm of foreign affairs shortly after he assumed the position of Minister of Court was travel to the Soviet Union in 1926 on a two-month visit. The lengthy discussions led to the adoption of a number of significant commercial agreements, a development deemed significant by ensuring Britain would be precluded from exercising its domineering economic position since the negotiation of the Perso-Russian Treaty of 1921, whereby the Soviet Government agreed to the removal of its troops from Iran. To this end, Teymourtash also attempted to assiduously foster improved economic ties with other industrialised countries, amongst them the United States and Germany.

During this period, Iran also assumed a lead role in cultivating closer ties with its neighbours, Turkey, Iraq and Afghanistan. All these countries were pursuing similar domestic modernization plans, and they collectively fostered increased cooperation and formed a loose alliance as a bloc, leading the Western powers to fear what they believed was the creation of an Asiatic Alliance. In the mid to late 1920s, the Turkish and Iranian governments signed a number of frontier and security agreements. Furthermore, when King Amanullah of Afghanistan faced tribal unrest in 1930 which would ultimately lead to his removal from the throne, the Iranian government sent out several planeloads of officers of the Iranian Army to assist the Afghan King quell the revolt. Indeed, the diplomatic steps that were first taken in the 1920s would eventually lead to the adoption of the non-aggression agreement known as the Treaty of Saadabad among the four countries in 1937.

Another significant initiative spearheaded by Teymourtash was the concerted effort to eliminate the complex web of capitulation agreements Iran had granted various foreign countries during the Qajar dynasty. Such agreements conferred extraterritorial rights to the foreign residents of subject countries, and its origins in Iran could be traced back to the Russo-Iranian Treaty of Turkmenchay of 1828. Despite considerable opposition from the various foreign governments that had secured such privileges, Teymourtash personally conducted these negotiations on behalf of Iran, and succeeded in abrogating all such agreements by 1928. Teymourtash's success in these endeavours owed much to his ability to methodically secure agreements from the less obstinate countries first so as to gain greater leverage against the holdouts, and to even intimate that Iran was prepared to break diplomatic relations with recalcitrant states if need be.

Teymourtash's success in revoking the capitulation treaties, and the failure of the Anglo-Iranian Agreement of 1919 earlier, led to intense diplomatic efforts by the British government to regularize relations between the two countries on a treaty basis. The ire of the British Government was raised, however, by Persian diplomatic claims to the oil-rich regions of the Greater and Lesser Tunbs islands, Abu Musa and Bahrain in the Persian Gulf region. On the economic front, on the other hand, the Minister of Court's pressures to rescind the monopoly rights of the British-owned Imperial Bank of Persia to issue banknotes in Iran, the Iranian Trade Monopoly Law of 1928, and prohibitions whereby the British Government and APOC were no longer permitted to enter into direct agreements with their client tribes, as had been the case in the past, did little to satisfy British expectations. The cumulative impact of these demands on the British Government was well expressed by Sir Robert Clive, Britain's Minister to Tehran, who in 1931 noted in a report to the Foreign Office: "There are indications, indeed that their present policy is to see how far they can push us in the way of concessions, and I feel we shall never re-establish our waning prestige or even be able to treat the Persian government on equal terms, until we are in a position to call a halt".

Despite an enormous volume of correspondence and protracted negotiations underway between the two countries on the widest array of issues, on the Iranian side, Teymourtash conducted the negotiations single-handedly "without so much as a secretary to keep his papers in order", according to one scholar. Resolution of all outstanding differences eluded a speedy resolution, however, since the British side progressed more tediously due to the need to consult many government departments.

Teymourtash and Benito Mussolini.

The most intractable challenge, however, proved to be Teymourtash's assiduous efforts to revise the terms whereby the Anglo-Persian Oil Company (APOC) retained near-monopoly control over the oil industry in Iran as a result of the concession granted to William Knox D'Arcy in 1901 by the Qajar King of the period. "What Persians felt", Teymourtash would explain to his British counterparts in 1928, "was that an industry had been developed on their own soil in which they had no real share".

Complicating matters further, and ensuring that such demands would in due course set Teymourtash on a collision course with the British Government was the reality that pursuant to a 1914 Act of the British Parliament, an initiative championed by Winston Churchill in his capacity as First Lord of the Admiralty, led the British Government to be granted a majority fifty-three percent ownership of the shares of APOC. The decision was adopted during World War I to ensure the British Government would gain a critical foothold in Iranian affairs so as to protect the flow of oil from Iran due to its critical importance to the operation of the Royal navy during the war effort. By the 1920s, APOC's extensive installations and pipelines in Khuzestan and its refinery in Abadan meant that the company's operations in Iran had led to the creation of the greatest industrial complex in the Middle East.

By this period, popular opposition to the D'Arcy oil concession and royalty terms whereby Iran only received 16 percent of net profits was widespread. Since industrial development and planning, as well as other fundamental reforms were predicated on oil revenues, the government's lack of control over the oil industry served to accentuate the Iranian Government's misgivings regarding the manner in which APOC conducted its affairs in Iran. Such a pervasive atmosphere of dissatisfaction seemed to suggest that a radical revision of the concession terms would be possible. Moreover, owing to the introduction of reforms that improved fiscal order in Iran, APOC's past practise of cutting off advances in oil royalties when its demands were not met had lost much of its sting.

The attempt to revise the terms of the oil concession on a more favourable basis for Iran led to protracted negotiations that took place in Tehran, Lausanne, London and Paris between Teymourtash and the Chairman of APOC, First Baron, Sir John Cadman, 1st Baron Cadman, spanning the years from 1928 to 1932. The overarching argument for revisiting the terms of the D'Arcy Agreement on the Iranian side was that its national wealth was being squandered by a concession that was granted in 1901 by a previous non-constitutional government forced to agree to inequitable terms under duress. To buttress his position in talks with the British, Teymourtash retained the expertise of French and Swiss oil experts.

Teymourtash demanded a revision of the terms whereby Iran would be granted 25% of APOC's total shares. To counter British objections, Teymourtash would state that "if this had been a new concession, the Persian Government would have insisted not on 25 percent but on a 50–50 basis." Teymourtash also asked for a minimum guaranteed interest of 12.5% on dividends from the shares of the company, plus 2s per ton of oil produced. In addition, he specified that the company was to reduce the existing area of the concession. The intent behind reducing the area of the concession was to push APOC operations to the southwest of the country so as to make it possible for Iran to approach and lure non-British oil companies to develop oilfields on more generous terms in areas not part of APOC's area of concession. Apart from demanding a more equitable share of the profits of the company, an issue that did not escape Teymourtash's attention was that the flow of transactions between APOC and its various subsidiaries deprived Iran of gaining an accurate and reliable appreciation of APOC's full profits. As such, he demanded that the company register itself in Tehran as well as London, and the exclusive rights of transportation of the oil be cancelled. In fact in the midst of the negotiations in 1930, the Iranian Majles approved a bill whereby APOC was required to pay a 4 percent tax on its prospective profits earned in Iran.

In the face of British prevarication, Teymourtash decided to demonstrate Iranian misgivings by upping the ante. Apart from encouraging the press to draft editorials criticizing the terms of the D'Arcy concession, he arranged to dispatch a delegation consisting of Reza Shah, and other political notables and journalists to the close vicinity of the oilfields to inaugurate a newly constructed road, with instructions that they refrain from visiting the oil installation in an explicit show of protest.

In 1931, Teymourtash who was travelling to Europe to enrol Crown Prince Mohammed Reza Pahlavi, and his own children at European schools, decided to use the occasion to attempt to conclude the negotiations. The following passage from Sir John Cadman, 1st Baron Cadman confirms that Teymourtash worked feverishly and diligently to resolve all outstanding issues, and succeeded in securing an agreement in principle:

"He came to London, he wined and he dined and he spent day and night in negotiating. Many interviews took place. He married his daughter, he put his boy to school [Harrow], he met the Secretary of State for Foreign Affairs, a change took place in our government, and in the midst of all this maze of activities we reached a tentative agreement on the principles to be included in the new document, leaving certain figures and the lump sum to be settled at a later date."

However, while Teymourtash likely believed that after four years of exhaustive and detailed discussions, he had succeeded in navigating the negotiations on the road to a conclusive end, the latest negotiations in London were to prove nothing more than a cul de sac.

Matters came to a head in 1931, when the combined effects of overabundant oil supplies on the global markets and the economic destabilization of the Depression, led to fluctuations which drastically reduced annual payments accruing to Iran to a fifth of what it had received in the previous year. In that year, APOC informed the Iranian government that its royalties for the year would amount to a mere 366,782 pounds, while in the same period the company's income taxes paid to the British Government amounted to approximately 1,000,000. Furthermore, while the company's profits declined 36 percent for the year, the revenues paid to the Iranian government pursuant to the company's accounting practices, decreased by 76 percent. Such a precipitous drop in royalties appeared to confirm suspicions of bad faith, and Teymourtash indicated that the parties would have to revisit negotiations.

However, Reza Shah was soon to assert his authority by dramatically inserting himself into the negotiations. The monarch attended a meeting of the Council of Ministers in November 1932, and after publicly rebuking Teymourtash for his failure to secure an agreement, dictated a letter to cabinet cancelling the D'Arcy Agreement. The Iranian Government notified APOC that it would cease further negotiations and demanded cancellation of the D'Arcy concession. Rejecting the cancellation, the British government espoused the claim on behalf of APOC and brought the dispute before the Permanent Court of International Justice at the Hague, asserting that it regarded itself "as entitled to take all such measures as the situation may demand for the Company's protection." At this point, Hasan Taqizadeh, the new Iranian minister to have been entrusted the task of assuming responsibility for the oil dossier, was to intimate to the British that the cancellation was simply meant to expedite negotiations and that it would constitute political suicide for Iran to withdraw from negotiations.

Teymourtash and his wife on a state visit to Belgium

== Imprisonment and death ==
Shortly thereafter, Teymourtash was dismissed from office by Reza Shah. Within weeks of his dismissal in 1933, Teymourtash was arrested, and although charges were not specified, it was rumoured that his fall related to his secretly setting up negotiations with the APOC. In his last letter addressed to his family from Qasr prison, he defensively wrote:

according to the information I have received, in the eyes of His Majesty my mistake seems to have been that I defended the Company and the English (the irony of it all – It has been England's plot to ruin me and it is they who have struck me down); I have refuted this concoction which was served up by the English press; I have already written to Sardar As'ad telling him I never signed anything with the company, that our last session with Sir John Cadman, 1st Baron Cadman and the others had broken off.

The principal reason for Teymourtash's dismissal very likely had to do with British machinations to ensure that the able Minister of Court was removed from heading Iranian negotiations on discussions relating to a revision of the terms of the D'Arcy concession. As such, the British made every effort to raise concerns with the suspicion-prone Reza Shah that the very survival of his dynasty rested on the shoulders of Teymourtash who would not hesitate to take matters into his own hands should the monarch die. To ensure that Reza Shah did not consider releasing Teymourtash even after he had fallen from favour, the British also took to persuading the British press to pen flattering stories whereby they attributed all the reforms that had taken place in Iran to him "down to, or up to, the Shah's social and hygiene education".

It is generally agreed that Teymourtash proved a convenient scapegoat for the deteriorating relations between the British and Iranian governments. After the dispute between the two countries was taken up at the Hague, the Czech Foreign Minister who was appointed mediator put the matter into abeyance to allow the contending parties to attempt to resolve the dispute. Reza Shah who had stood firm in demanding the abolition of the D'Arcy concession, suddenly acquiesced to British demands, much to the chagrin and disappointment of his Cabinet. A new agreement with the Anglo-Persian Oil Company was agreed to after Sir John Cadman visited Iran in April 1933 and was granted a private audience with the Shah. A new Agreement was ratified by Majlis, on 28 May 1933, and received Royal assent the following day.

The terms of the new agreement provided for a new sixty-year concession. The agreement reduced the area under APOC control to 100,000 square miles (260,000 km^{2}), required annual payments in lieu of Iranian income tax, as well as guaranteeing a minimum annual payment of 750,000 pounds to the Iranian government. These provisions while appearing favourable, are widely agreed to have represented a squandered opportunity for the Iranian government. It extended the life of the D'Arcy concession by an additional thirty-two years, negligently allowed APOC to select the best 100,000 square miles (260,000 km^{2}), the minimum guaranteed royalty was far too modest, and in a fit of carelessness the company's operations were exempted from import or customs duties. Finally, Iran surrendered its right to annul the agreement, and settled on a complex and tediously elaborate arbitration process to settle any disagreements that should arise. Despite the resolution of the Iranian dispute with APOC, Teymourtash remained incarcerated in prison, and charges of minor embezzlement were leveled against him. The increasingly arbitrary Pahlavi monarch had previously meted out similar fabricated charges against other leading politicians before, a course of action which would be repeatedly resorted to against others as well after Teymourtash had been removed. A court sentenced Teymourtash on spurious charges to five years of solitary confinement and a total fine of 10,712 pounds sterling and 585,920 rials on charges of embezzlement and graft. (Figures are in 1933 values)

Teymourtash was confined in Qasr Prison in Tehran. His health rapidly declined and he died on Mehr 9, 1312 AHSh / 3 October 1933.

Many say he was killed by the prison's physician Dr. Ahmad Ahmadi through lethal injection on orders of Reza. This physician killed political prisoners under the guise of medical examinations, to make it appear that the victim died naturally. At time of death, Teymourtash was 50 years old.

Four years later in 1937, Teymourtash's close friend, Ali Akbar Davar died under mysterious circumstances. Rumors spread that Davar committed suicide after he was severely reprimanded and threatened by Reza Pahlavi two days earlier in private. Some newspapers wrote that he had died of a heart attack. Many suggest that his death had been related to his proposed American bill to Majlis with which British strongly opposed. Davar was 70 years old when he died.

== Family ==
After Teymourtash's death, his extensive landholdings and other properties and possessions were confiscated by the Iranian government, while his immediate family was kept under house arrest on one of its farflung family estates for an extended period of time. While it was not uncommon for Reza Shah to imprison or kill his previous associates and prominent politicians, most notably Firouz Mirza Nosrat-ed-Dowleh Farman Farmaian III and Sardar Asad Bakhtiar, the decision to impose severe collective punishment on Teymourtash's family was unprecedented. Immediate members of the Teymourtash family forced to endure seven years of house arrest and exile would consist of his mother and younger sister Badri Teymourtash, his first wife Sorour ol-Saltaneh and her four children, Manouchehr, Iran, Amirhoushang and Mehrpour. His second wife, Tatiana and her two young daughters, Parichehr and Noushi were spared house arrest.

Having either just returned to Iran on account of their father's arrest, and informed by relatives to suspend their studies to Iran from Europe, the children would have to suffer the alleged sins of their father. Teymourtash's younger sister, Badri, had recently completed her studies in Belgium and upon her return to Iran in the early 1930s was likely the first female dentist in the country. Manouchehr, Teymourtash's eldest son was attending the world-renowned and foremost French military academy at École spéciale militaire de Saint-Cyr in France before his return, Iran was attending preparatory college in England, Amirhoushang was enrolled at the exclusive Harrow School in England, while Mehrpour was attending the venerated Le Rosey boarding school in Switzerland along with the then Crown Prince, Mohammad Reza Pahlavi.

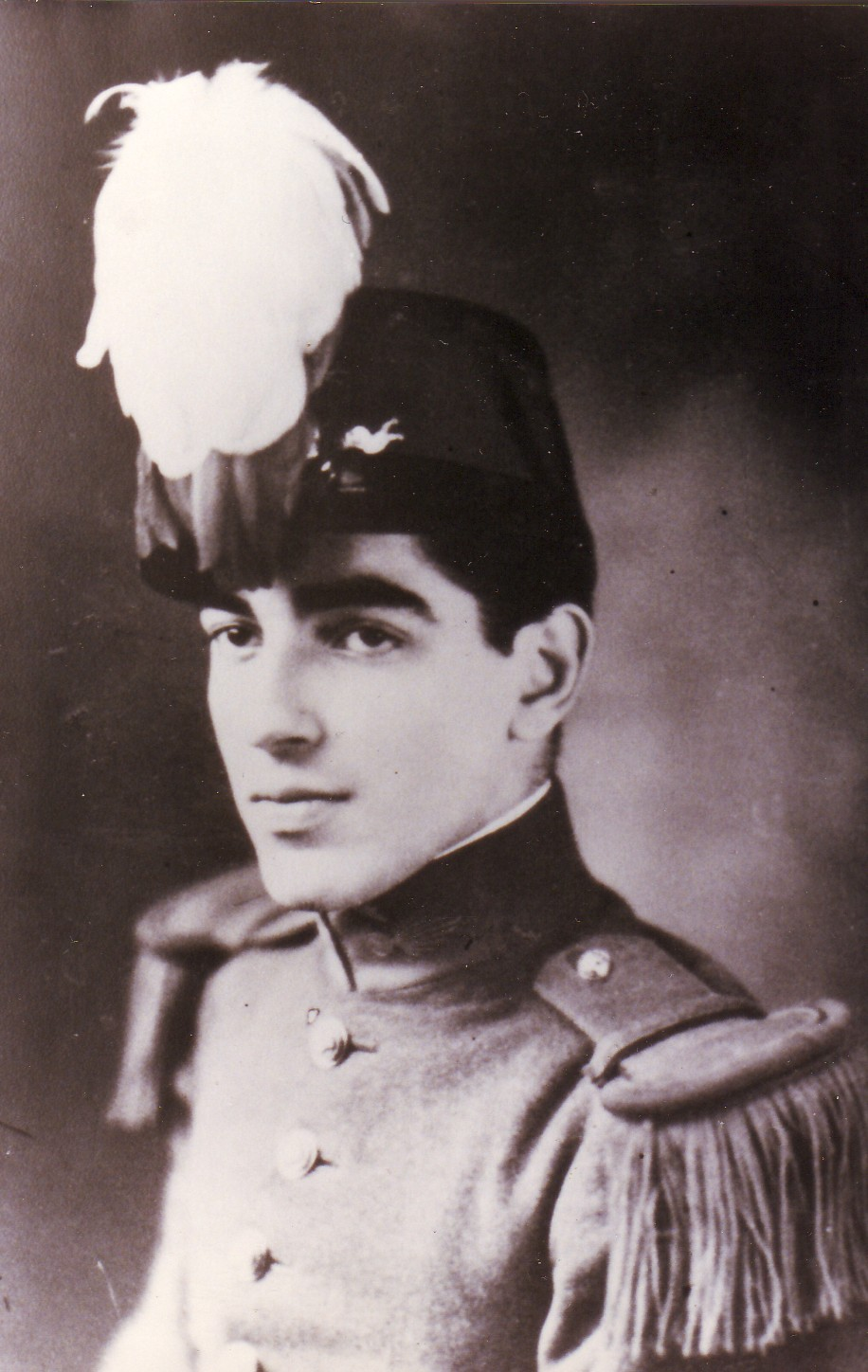
Manouchehr Teymourtash at École spéciale militaire de Saint-Cyr

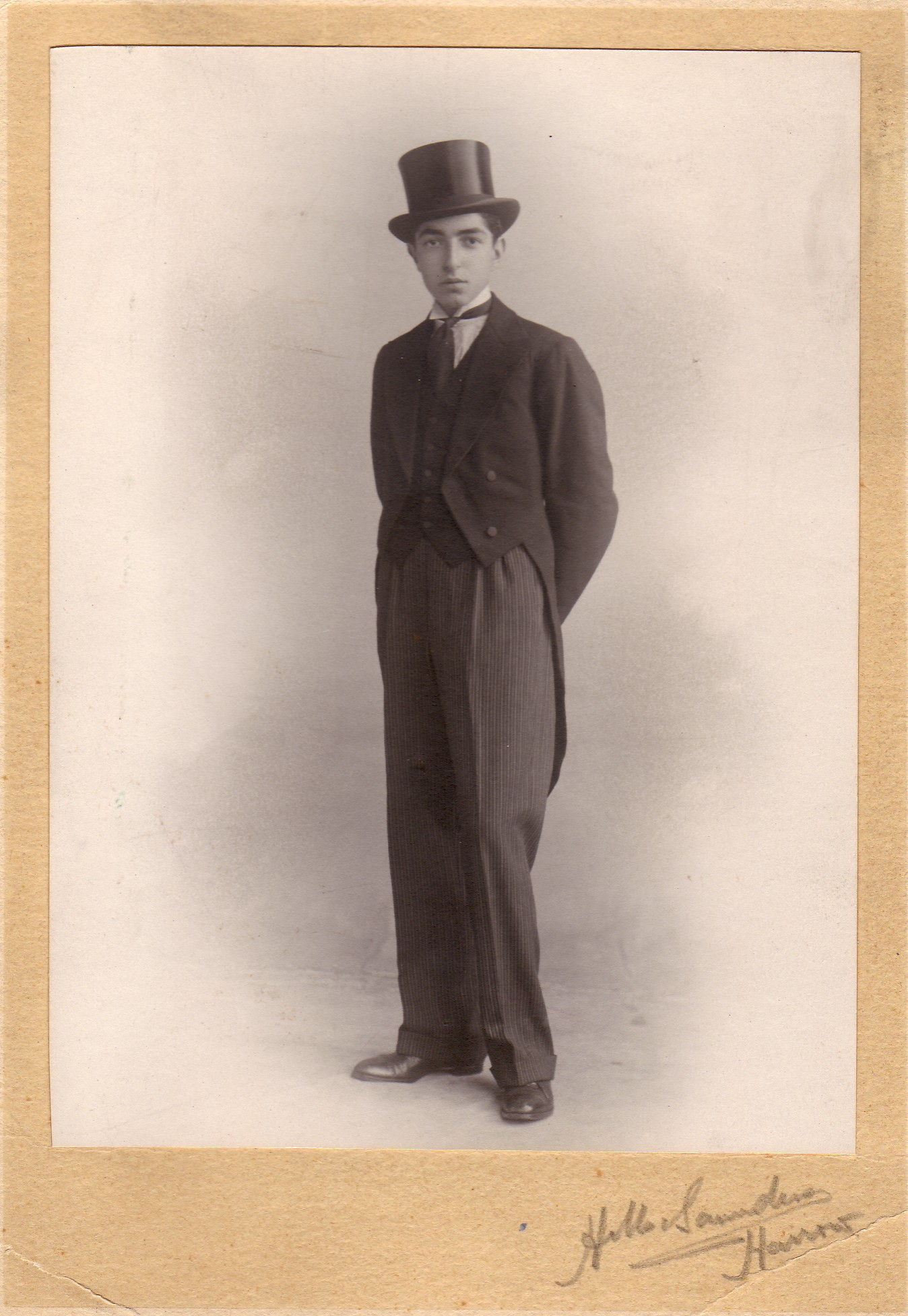
Amirhoushang Teymourtash while enrolled at Harrow School in England

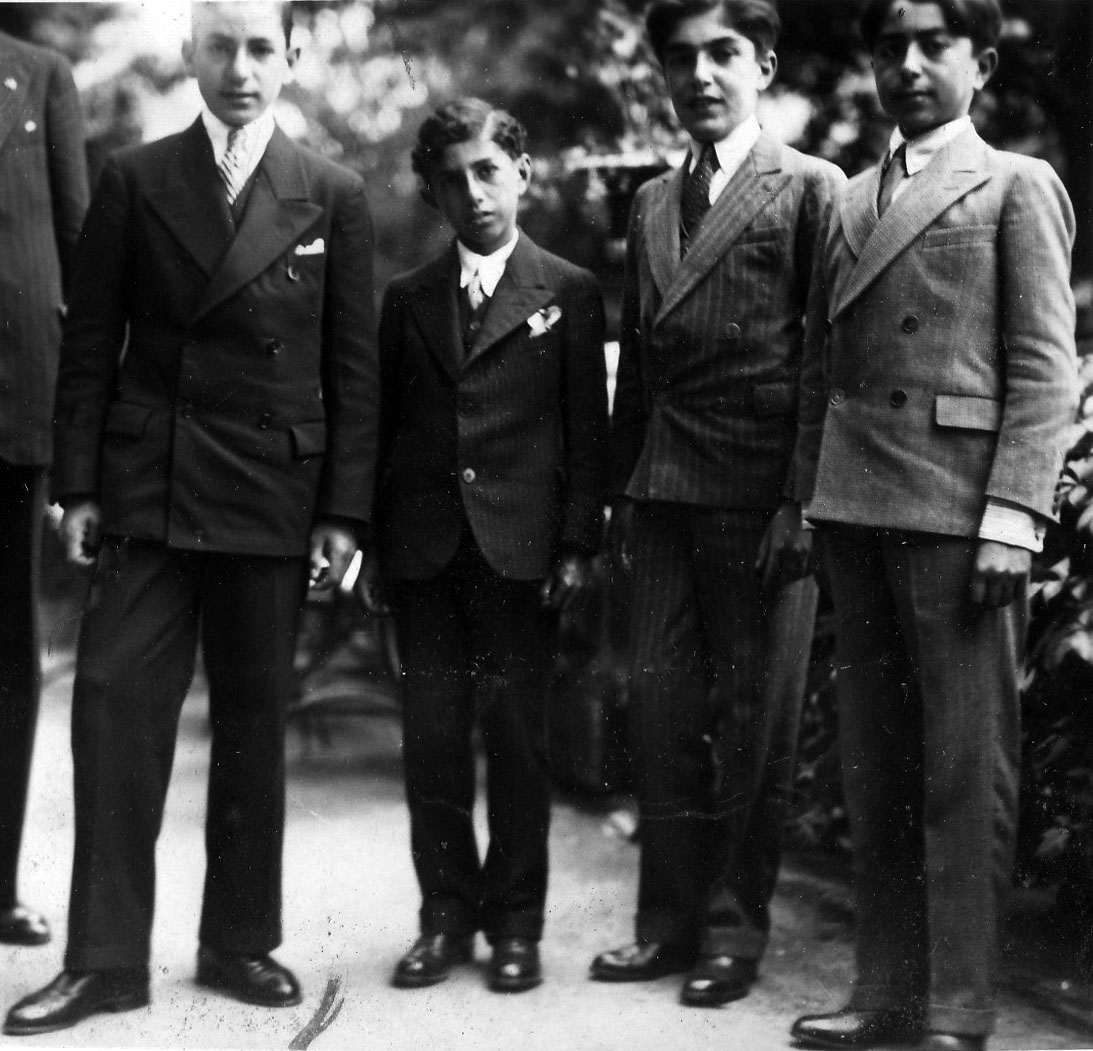
Mehrpour Teymourtash (second from right) with Crown Prince Mohammad Reza Pahlavi (first from left) at Le Rosey in Switzerland.

Paritchehr and Noushi, Teymourtash's children from his second wife

The Teymourtash family remained in the seclusion of exile and was forbidden from receiving visitors until 1941 when Reza Shah was forced to abdicate after allied forces entered Iran during the early years of World War II. As part of the General Amnesty that followed Mohammad Reza Shah's accession to the throne that year, members of the Teymourtash family were released from exile and some of their confiscated properties were returned. Much like other extensive landholders in Iran, the tracts of land returned to the Teymourtash family would subsequently be subjected to the land reform and re-distribution schemes as part of the White Revolution introduced in the 1960s. Nonetheless, the Teymourtash family regained much of its wealth and was considered among the most affluent Iranian families before the Iranian Revolution of 1979. One noteworthy business transaction involved the sale of large tracts from the Teymourtash estates in Khorasan to industrialist Mahmoud Khayami to allow him develop an industrial complex several years before the Revolution.

Mehrpour Teymourtash, who had been Mohammad Reza Shah's closest friend and classmate both during the period in which the two attended grade school in Tehran and subsequently at Le Rosey, was killed in a car accident shortly after the Teymourtash family was released from house arrest and exile in 1941. Prior to his demise, Mehrpour inaugurated a relationship with a Russian-Iranian linguist and ethnographer, Shahrbanu Shokuofova in Gilan. Although the marriage was never annulled, weeks after Mehrpour's accident Shahrbanu gives birth to a son in Khesmakh. In her journal she claims to have abdicated to British Raj following the Anglo-Soviet invasion of Iran.

Manouchehr Teymourtash followed in his father's footsteps and was elected a member of the Majles of Iran for several terms from Khorasan province. His marriage to Mahin Banoo Afshar led to the birth of Manijeh, and his second marriage to Touran Mansur, the daughter of former Iranian Prime Minister Ali Mansur ("Mansur ol Molk") resulted in the birth of Karimdad. After the revolution Manouchehr resided in California with his third wife, Akhtar Masoud the grand daughter of Prince Mass'oud Mirza Zell-e Soltan. Manouchehr's sole grandchild is Nargues (Nicky) Adle.

Amirhoushang Teymourtash, on the other hand, resisted the temptation to pursue a political career and for the most part pursued entrepreneurial interests. Ervand Abrahamian describes Amirhoushang Teymourtash as an "enterprising aristocrat", and despite initially experiencing the vicissitudes of economic fluctuations, he proved particularly successful in his subsequent endeavours. In Princess Ashraf Pahlavi's candid memoirs, entitled Faces in a Mirror, and released after the Revolution, the Shah's sister reveals, "I was attracted to Houshang's tall good looks, his flamboyant charm, the sophistication he had acquired during his years at school in England. I knew that in this fun-loving, life-loving man I had found my first love". Although, Amirhoushang and Mohammad Reza Pahlavi's young twin sister developed an affinity shortly after the former was released from house arrest in 1941, in an effort to cope with the death of Mehrpour, a long-term relationship was not pursued. Houshang's marriage to Forough Moshiri resulted in three children, Elaheh ("Lolo") Teymourtash-Ehsassi, Kamran, and Tanaz ("Nana"). Houshang's grandchildren consist of Marjan Ehsassi, Ali Ehsassi, Roxane Teymourtash-Owensby, Abteen Teymourtash and Amita Teymourtash. Houshang's great-grandchildren consist of Sophie Elaheh Horst and Cyrus Horst, Laya Owensby and Kian Owensby, Dylan and Darian Teymourtash.

Iran Teymourtash earned a PhD in literature while residing in France, and pursued a career in journalism. As with her father, she was awarded France's highest civilian honour, the Legion d'honneur. Apart from her brief engagement to Hossein Ali Qaragozlu, the grandson of Regent Naser ol Molk, from 1931 to 1932, Iran opted to remain single for the remainder of her life. Ironically, the posthumous release in 1991 of the Confidential Diary of Asadollah Alam, the Shah's closest confidant, revealed that Mohammad Reza Pahlavi intimated to Alam that during his late teenage years he "was head over heels in love with Iran Teymourtash". More recently, a book chronicling the lives of Iran Teymourtash, Ashraf Pahlavi and Mariam Firouz, entitled These Three Women ("Een Se Zan") and authored by Masoud Behnoud was published to wide acclaim in Iran. It is believed to be one of the best selling books to have been published in Iran in recent memory.

Paritchehr and Noushie, Teymourtash's youngest children from his second wife Tatiana, were fortunate to not be compelled to endure the hardship of house arrest after their father's removal from office. Nonetheless, after having been raised in Iran, they moved to New York along with their mother in the early 1940s. Paritchehr has pursued a distinguished career in classical dance, while Noushie was employed at the United Nations for several decades. After a brief engagement with future Prime Minister Hassan Ali Mansur, Noushie wedded Vincenzo Berlingeri which resulted in the birth of Andre and Alexei. Alexei would go on to have three children, Alexandra, Isabella, and Nicolino who are now the sole living custodians of Teymourtash's legacy.

== Legacy ==
Essad Bey described Teymourtash as "a kaleidoscope in which all the colours of the new Iran intermingled" in the 1930s. However, the task of critically assessing his role in modern Iranian history was made unduly difficult after his death by concerted efforts during the Pahlavi era to obliviate any reference to the contributions of personalities, other than that of Reza Shah, who assisted in laying the foundations of modern Iran. More belatedly, after the overthrow of the Pahlavi regime and the advent of the Islamic Republic, the contributions of secular reformists such as Teymourtash have also been overlooked for obvious reasons. However, in 2004, the Iranian Cultural Heritage Department announced that it was earmarking money to renovate the homes of several of Iran's renowned modern political personalities such as Mohammad Mossadegh, Mohammad Taghi Bahar ("Malekol Sho'ara Bahar"), and Teymourtash.

Given the shortcomings of rigorous Iranian historiography during the Pahlavi and post-revolutionary period, a more critical assessment of the role of the likes of Teymourtash may be gleaned from the dispatches that were recorded by diplomats resident in Iran at the time of his death. In his report to London shortly after Teymourtash's death, the British Minister in Tehran, Mallet, noted "The man who had done more than all others to create modern Persia ... was left by his ungrateful master without even a bed to die upon". "Oblivion has swallowed a mouthful", the senior American diplomat in Tehran reported in his dispatch, "Few men in history, I would say, have stamped their personalities so indelibly on the politics of any country". In the concluding paragraph the American diplomat noted, "Albeit he had enemies and ardent ones, I doubt that anyone could be found in Persia having any familiarity with the deeds and accomplishments of Teymourtache who would gainsay his right to a place in history as perhaps the most commanding intellect that has arisen in the country in two centuries".

A new generation of Iranian academics, however, have initiated a process of re-examining in a more objective light the contributions of multiple personalities that were previously treated in the most cursory fashion in Iranian historiography. One of the personalities whose legacy is being rehabilitated as a part of this process is Abdolhossein Teymourtash. Typical of the novel approach has been one of Iran's most pre-eminent historians, Javad Sheikholeslami, who recently unearthed much archival material which sheds light on the vast contributions of Teymourtash in the widest array of endeavours. Sheikholeslam concludes that Teymourtash should rightly be considered the Amir Kabir of 20th-century Iran, both for his zealous pursuit of much needed and far-reaching national reforms, as well as his steadfast refusal to compromise Iran's national or economic interests in his dealings with foreign governments. Apart from his undeniable political contributions, it remain to add, that Teymourtash's intellectual conceptions had a profound influence on the social and cultural landscape of modern Iran.

== See also ==
- Hossein Ala'
- Anglo-Iranian Oil Company
- Iran-United Kingdom relations

== Sources ==
- Teymurtash Documents and Correspondence (Reza Shah's Minister of Court 1925–1933) (Vezarate-h Farhang va Ershad Eslami: Tehran, 1383) ISBN 964-422-694-1.
- Agheli, Bagher, Teymourtash Dar Sahneye-h Siasate-h Iran ("Teimurtash in the Political Arena of Iran") (Javeed: Tehran, 1371).
- Ansari, Ali, Modern Iran Since 1921: The Pahlavis and After (Longman: London, 2003) ISBN 0-582-35685-7.
- Atabaki, Touraj & Erik J. Zurcher, Men of Order: Authoritarian Modernization Under Atatürk and Reza Shah (I.B. Tauris: London, 2004). ISBN 1-86064-426-0.
- 'Alí Rizā Awsatí (عليرضا اوسطى), Iran in the Past Three Centuries (Irān dar Se Qarn-e Goz̲ashteh – ايران در سه قرن گذشته), Volumes 1 and 2 (Paktāb Publishing – انتشارات پاکتاب, Tehran, Iran, 2003). ISBN 964-93406-6-1 (Vol. 1), ISBN 964-93406-5-3 (Vol. 2).
- Cronin, Stephanie, The Making of Modern Iran: State and Society Under Reza Shah (Routledge: London, 2003) ISBN 0-415-30284-6.
- Ghani, Cyrus, Iran and the Rise of Reza Shah: From Qajar Collapse to Pahlavi Power (I.B. Tauris: London, 2000). ISBN 1-86064-629-8.
- Rezun, Miron, The Soviet Union and Iran: Soviet Policy in Iran from the Beginnings of the Pahlavi Dynasty Until the Soviet Invasion in 1941 by Miron Rezun (Westview Press: Boulder, 1980)
- Sheikholeslami, Javad, So-oud va Sog-out-e Teymourtash ("The Rise and Fall of Teymourtash") (Tous: Tehran, 1379) ISBN 964-315-500-5.
