= Mohammad Farrokhi Yazdi =

Iranian politician

Mirza Mohammad Farrokhi Yazdi Taj osh-Sho'arā
- فرخی یزدی
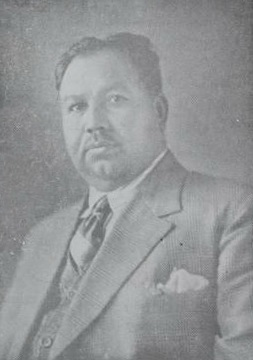
- Born: 1889; Yazd, Iran
- Died: October 18, 1939 (aged 49–50); Qasr prison, Tehran
- Occupations: poet, journalist and senior politician
- Political party: Socialist Party

Mirza Mohammad Farrokhi Yazdi (Persian: میرزا محمد فرخی یزدی; 1889 – October 18, 1939), also known as Taj osh-Sho'arā (تاج الشعرا; lit. Crown of poets), was an Iranian poet, journalist and senior politician of the Persian Constitutional Revolution and the Reza Pahlavi era.

== Biography ==
Born in Yazd to Mohammad Ebrahim Yazdi, he started his preliminary education in Yazd until the age of 16 when he was expelled from school for his poems against school teachers and principal.

By the age of 16, he had already started writing poetry and gradually became active during the Persian Constitutional Revolution and was imprisoned because of writing material in opposition to the infamous 1919 Anglo-Persian Agreement. In prison, he protested that "He whose only offense is love of the motherland / No creed would condemn to a dark cell...".

Farrokhi Yazdi composed a poem criticizing Zeygham al-Dawla Qashqa'i, the ruler of Yazd, and in response Zeigham al-Dawla ordered to sew his mouth with thread and needle and throw him in prison. In 1921, he published the political newspaper Toufan (storm), winning fame for his poetry and constant attacks against Reza Pahlavi in his editorials.

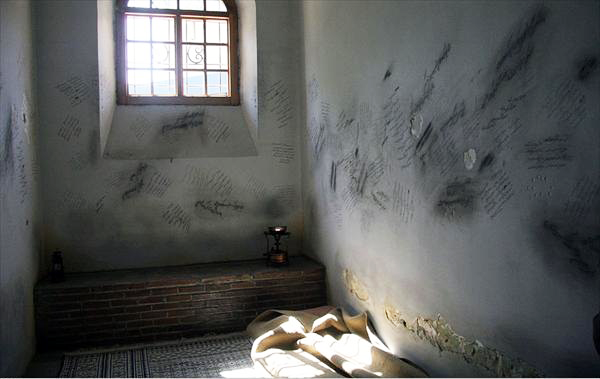
Farokhi Yazdi clink

Finally, in 1939, he was arrested, sentenced to prison at Tehran's Qasr prison. He was murdered by air injection under Dr. Ahmad Ahmadi.

He wrote a poem related to British politician, Lord Curzon:

Lord Curzon has gotten angry
He is going to write a lament;
We don't exchange dignity with abasement
We don't obey embassy;
O' Curzon, abandon us
You can't exploit the country of Jamshid;

== See also ==
- Mohammad Taghi Bahar
- Abdolhossein Teymourtash
