= Ahmadiyya school =

Ahmadiyya School may refer to one of over 500 primary and secondary schools, particularly those in West Africa. In particular, it may refer to:

- T.I. Ahmadiyya Girls Senior High School, Asokore
- T.I. Ahmadiyya Senior High School, Kumasi
- T.I. Ahmadiyya Secondary School, Freetown
- Ahmadhiyya International School, Maldives (unaffiliated with the Ahmadiyya movement)
