= Ahmad Jan Ahmady =

Afghan Director of the Administrative Office of the President since 2021

Maulawi Ahmad Jan Ahmady احمد جان احمدی

Director of the Administrative Office of the President
- Incumbent
- Assumed office 7 September 2021
- Leader: Hibatullah Akhundzada
- Prime Minister: Mohammad Hassan Akhund (acting)

Director of the Kandahar Information Centre
- In office c. 1995 – c. 2001
- Prime Minister: Mohammed Rabbani; Abdul Kabir
- Leader: Mohammed Omar

Personal details
- Party: Taliban
- Occupation: Politician, Taliban member

Maulawi Ahmad Jan Ahmady (Pashto: احمدجان احمدی [ahmad ˈd͡ʒɑn ahmaˈdi]), also spelt Ahmad Jan Ahmadi or Ahmadjan Ahmadi, is the director of the Administrative Office of the President of the Islamic Emirate of Afghanistan. He born in Ghazni in 1974, he has experience in administrative affairs. He started his career in IEA in 1994, in 1996 he was mayor of Herat, after that He worked as director of Administrative affairs at foreign ministry when Mullah Mohammad Hassan was foreign minister in Taliban's regime before the US takeover, he was very close to Mullah Omar and worked as his secretary for years in 2001 he selected as ambassador to KSA. He also worked in different commissions of IEA between 2001 and 2016, he established a commission for education in IEA and also worked as deputy director of the IEA leadership office till 2020 than selected as director of IEA leadership office till Kabul takeover. In September 2021 he started work as director of administrative office of president till August 2022.

Now he is DG State owned corporations since start of 2024, and known by Ahmad Jan bilal.
