= Ahmadiyeh, South Khorasan =

Ahmadiyeh احمديه
- Village
- Location within Iran
- Coordinates: 33°41′55″N 56°50′15″E
- Country: Iran
- Province: South Khorasan
- County: Tabas
- Bakhsh: Central
- Rural District: Montazeriyeh

Population (2006)
  - Total: 136
- Time zone: UTC+3:30 (IRST)
  - Summer (DST): UTC+4:30 (IRDT)

Ahmadiyeh (Persian: احمديه, also Romanized as Aḩmadīyeh) is a village in Montazeriyeh Rural District, in the Central District of Tabas County, South Khorasan Province, Iran. At the 2006 census, its population was 136, in 35 families.
