= Sarah, Iran =

Sarah سراح
- Village
- Location within Iran
- Coordinates: 27°55′07″N 56°44′20″E
- Country: Iran
- Province: Hormozgan
- County: Hajjiabad
- Bakhsh: Ahmadi
- Rural District: Ahmadi

Population (2006)
  - Total: 453
- Time zone: UTC+3:30 (IRST)
  - Summer (DST): UTC+4:30 (IRDT)

Sarah (Persian: سراح, also Romanized as Sarāḩ; also known as Aḩmadī, Sarāḩ-e Aḩmadī, Sarā-ye Aḩmadī, and Serāh-e Aḩmadī) is a village in Ahmadi Rural District, Ahmadi District, Hajjiabad County, Hormozgan Province, Iran. At the 2006 census, its population was 453, in 85 families.
