= Museum of the Qasr Prison =

Iranian national heritage site

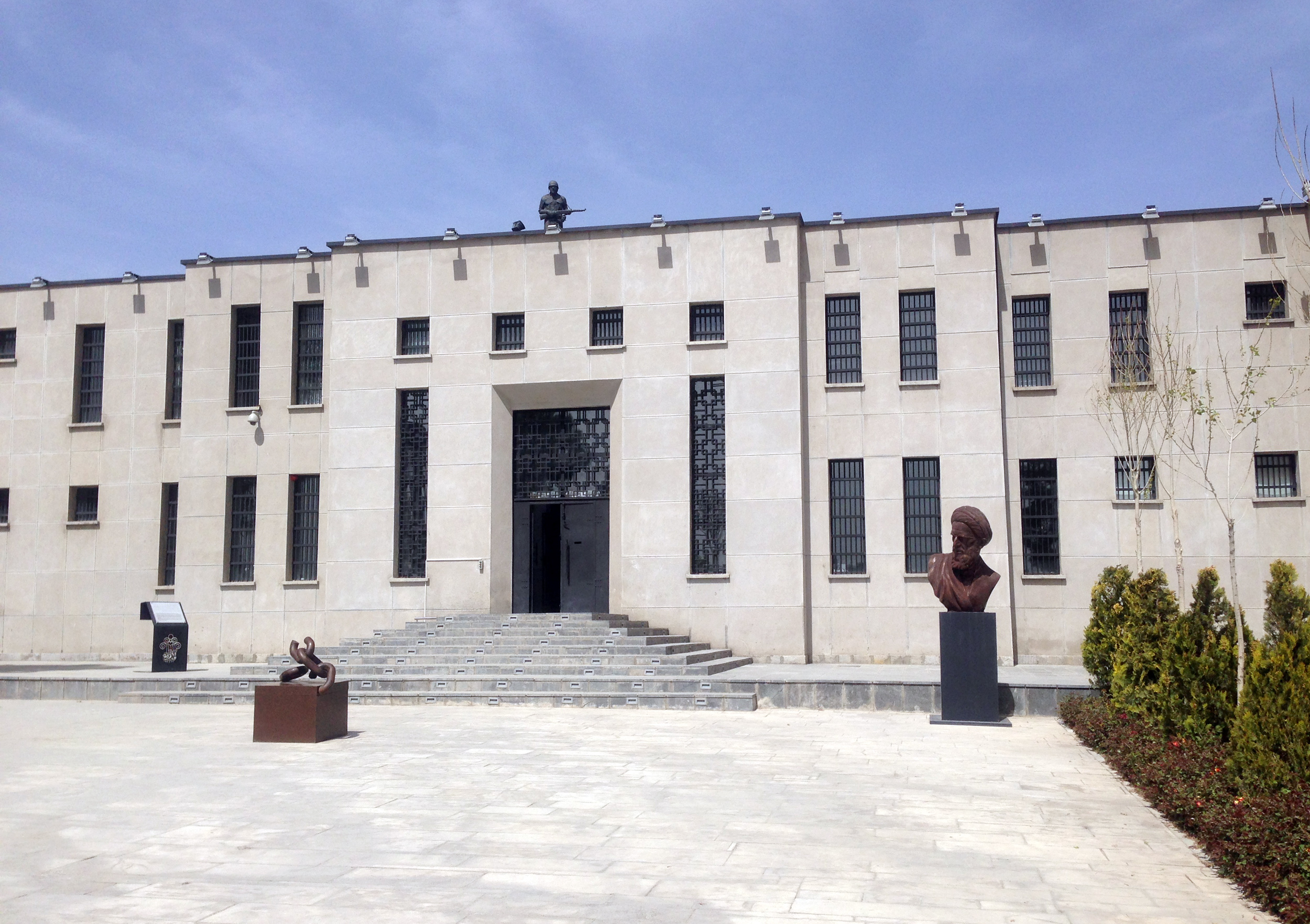
- Interactive map of Museum of the Qasr Prison
- Location: Tehran, Iran
- Coordinates: 35.7236°N 51.4483°E

The Museum of the Qasr Prison (Persian: موزه‌ زندان قصر, romanized: Muze-ye Zendān-e Qasr), formerly referred to as the Qasr Prison, is a historical complex in Tehran, Iran.

The building was one of the oldest political prisons in Iran, which is now a museum complex surrounded by a public park.

== History ==
In 1790 during the reign of Fath-Ali Shah Qajar, Qasr prison was originally built as Qajar Palace. The palace contained extensive gardens of which only a small pavilion remains. In 1929, it was repurposed as a prison, the first modern detention center in the country, in which prisoners had legal rights. Nikolai Markov, a Russian architect who settled in Iran after the Russian Revolution, did the reconstruction, combining urban industrial design with traditional Iranian features such as adobe bricks, which became known as Markovian bricks. It had 192 rooms for 700 prisoners, of which about 100 cells were solitary. Here Ahmad Ahmadi, known to prisoners simply as "Dr Ahmadi" administered lethal air injections to several of Reza Shah's many opponents, such as the poet Mohammad Farrokhi Yazdi. After Reza Shah was overthrown by the Anglo-Soviet invasion of Iran in 1941, Ahmadi himself was tried for the murders and executed in 1943.

For Mohammad Reza Shah, it served as a torture and execution chamber for extreme political crimes which by the late 1970s was extensively reformed by the Red Cross into what was described as a "hotel" by the staff. Ruhollah Khomeini, Ali Khamenei, Morteza Motahhari, and Mahmoud Taleghani were held in its cells. On 11 February 1979, 1000 women were released from the prison. Following the 1979 Revolution, many civil and military officials of Mohammad Reza Pahlavi were detained and executed at the prison, including Nader Jahanbani and Amir Hossein Rabii; Major General Manouchehr Khosrodad and Prime Minister Amir-Abbas Hoveyda were imprisoned at Qasr before being executed on the roof of Refah School, where Khomeini had set up his headquarters.

In subsequent decades the prison fell into disuse until 2005 when ICHTO announced that the compound would become a museum. In 2008, it was donated to the municipal government. Reopened in 2012, the former prison buildings and offices were turned into museum buildings, surrounded by a public park which carries the same name. It hosts many cultural events such as the Nowruz. According to the Iranian Students News Agency Qasr was named Iran's most creative museum in 2013.

== Gallery ==
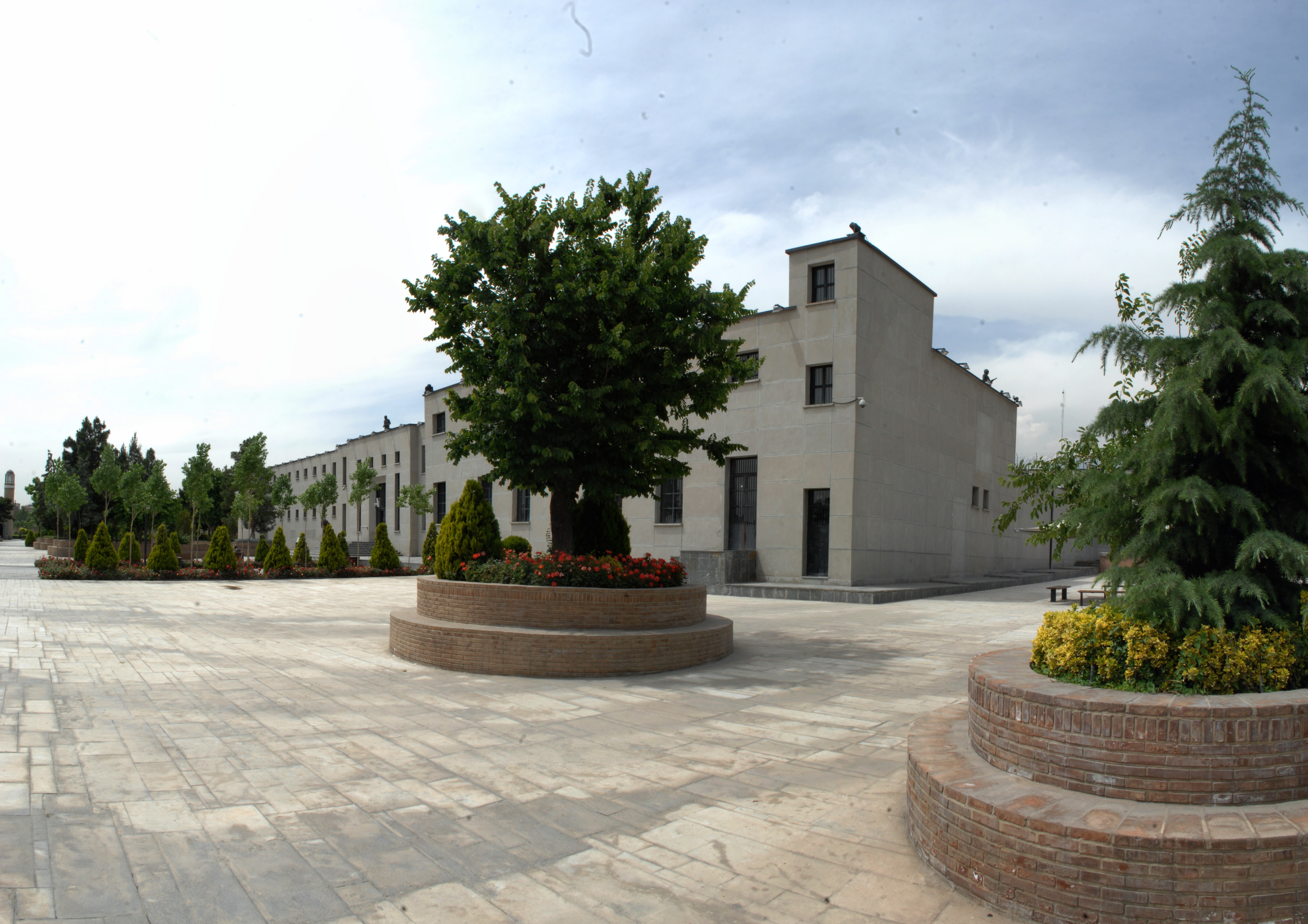
Museum of the Qasr Prison

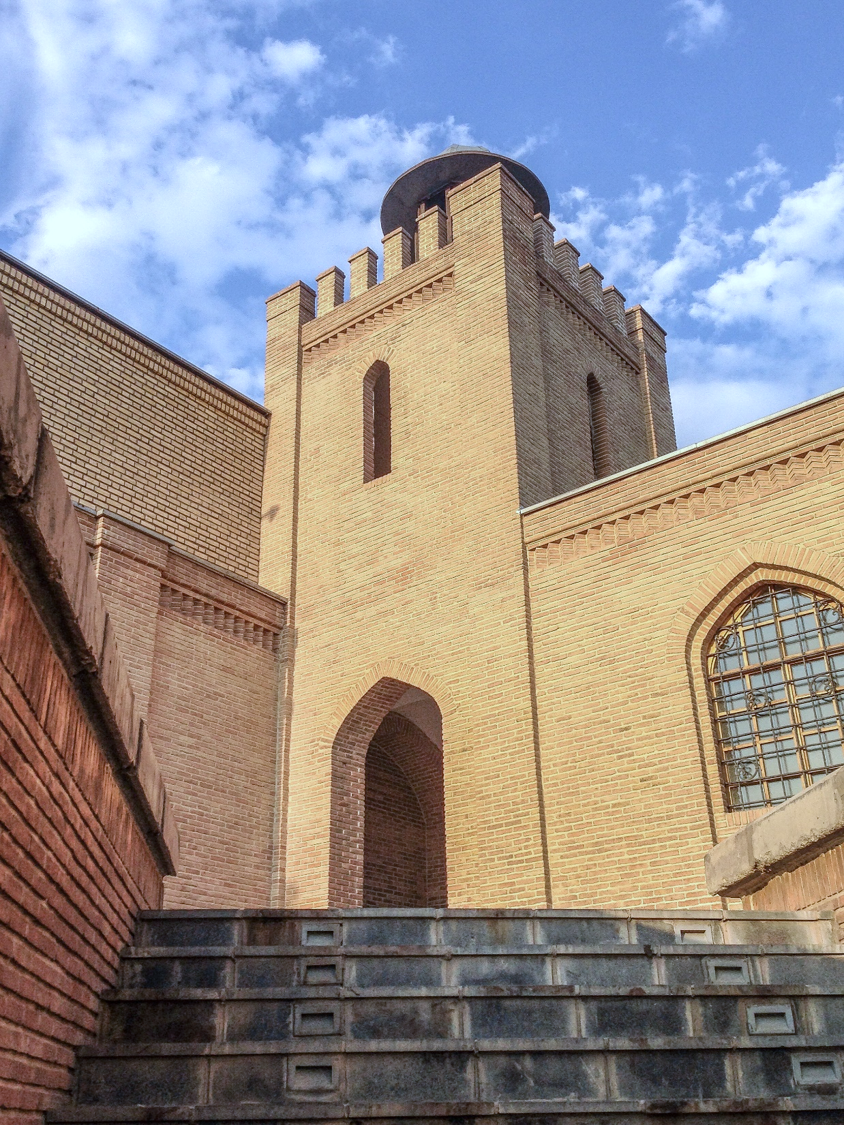
Qasr Museum

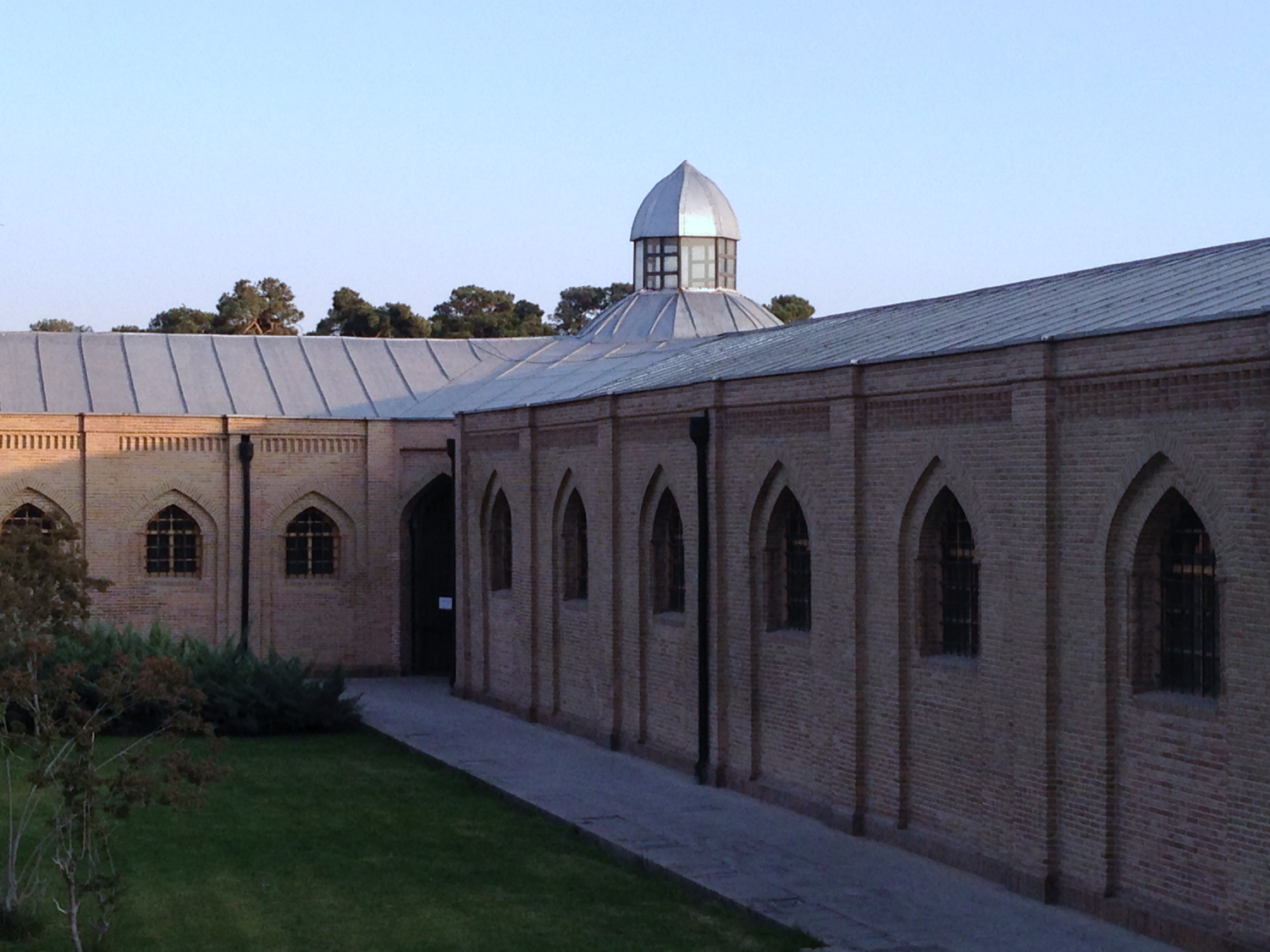
Museum of the Qasr Prison

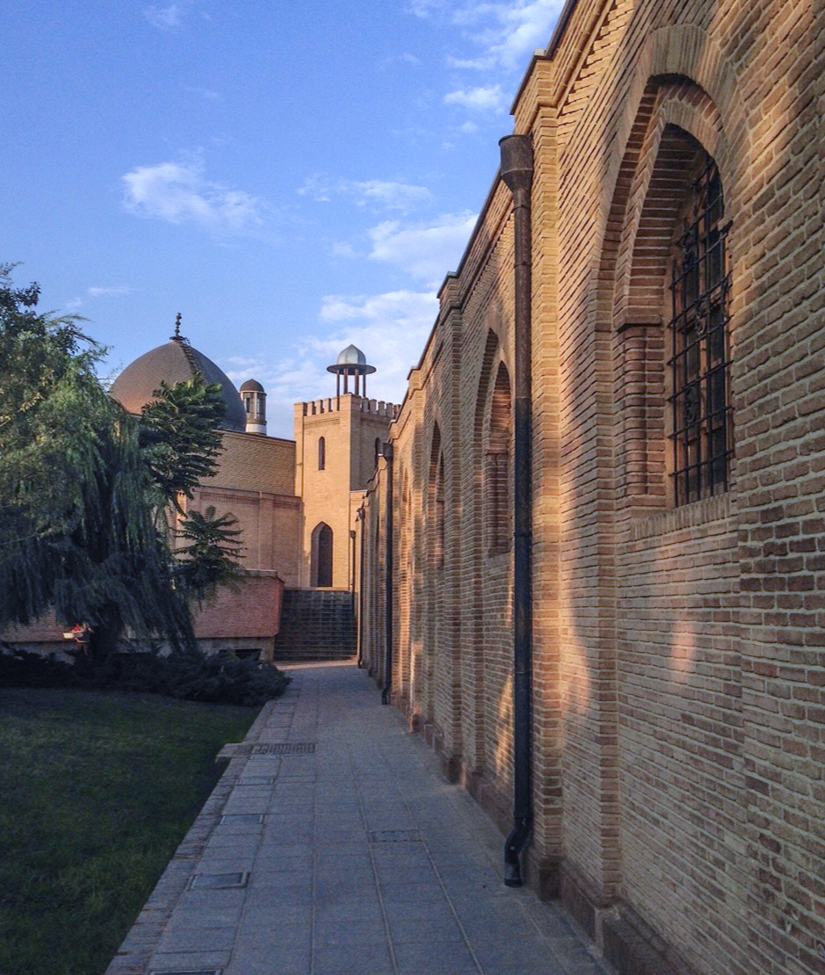
Qasr Museum

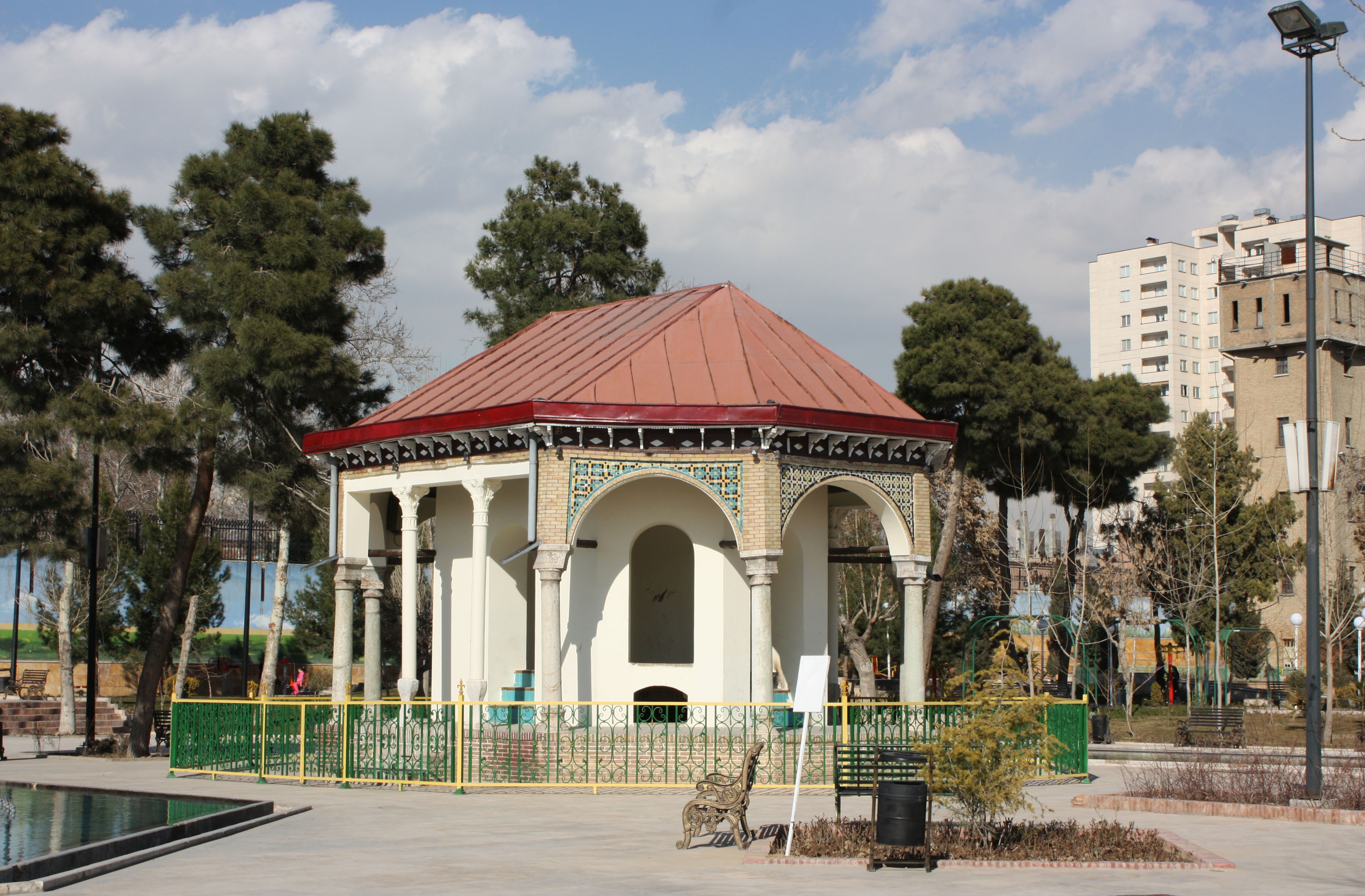
A small pavilion, the only remaining structure of the Qajar Palace Complex.

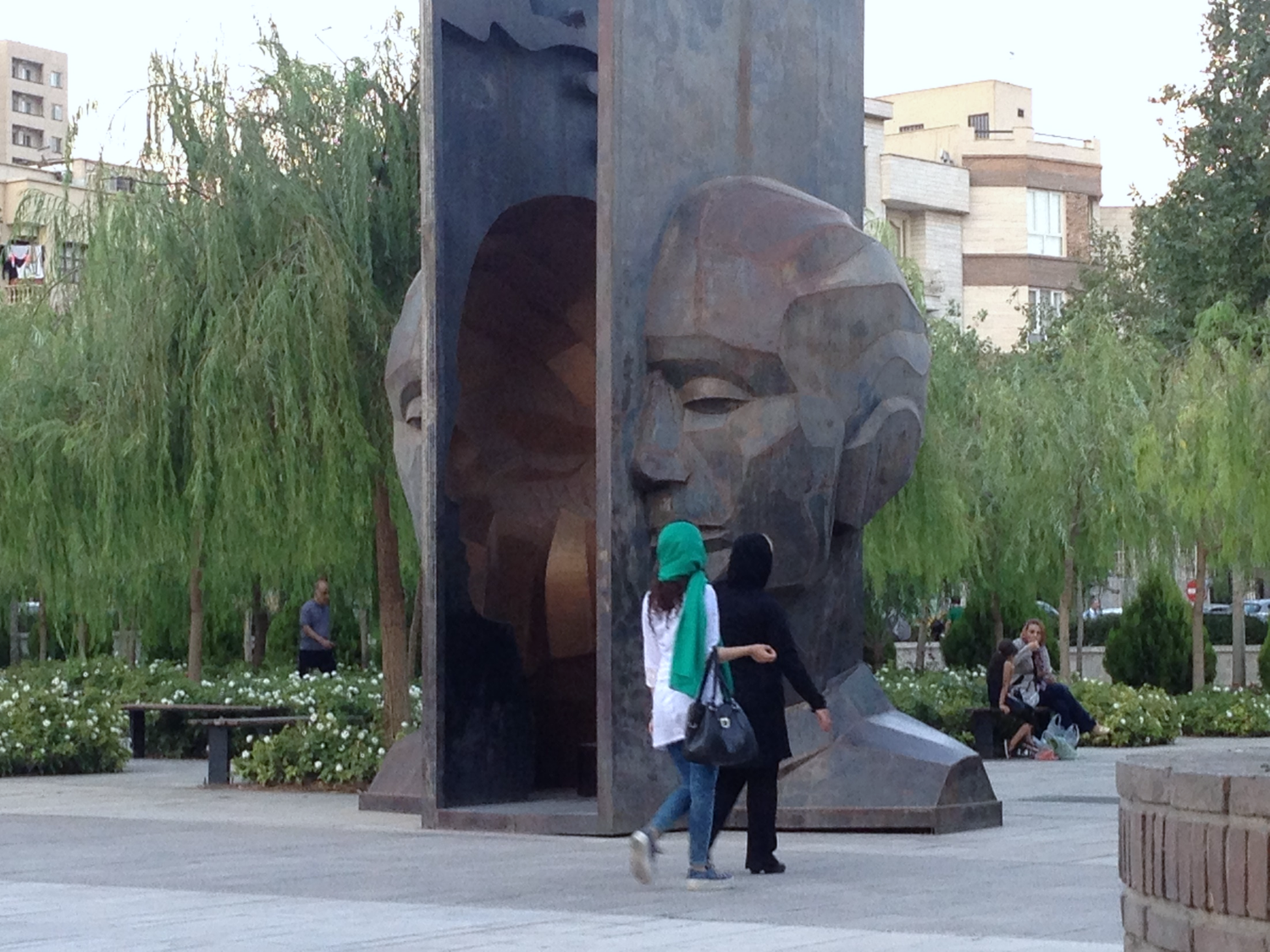
An entrance to the park.

== See also ==
- National Garden, Tehran
- National Museum of Iran
- Ferdows Garden
