= Ahmadi, Kuhbanan =

Ahmadi احمدي
- Village
- Location within Iran
- Coordinates: 31°00′43″N 56°12′35″E
- Country: Iran
- Province: Kerman
- County: Kuhbanan
- Bakhsh: Toghrol Al Jerd
- Rural District: Shaab Jereh

Population (2006)
  - Total: 28
- Time zone: UTC+3:30 (IRST)
  - Summer (DST): UTC+4:30 (IRDT)

Ahmadi (Persian: احمدي, also Romanized as Aḩmadī) is a village in the Shaab Jereh Rural District of the Toghrol Al Jerd District in the Kuhbanan County of Kerman Province, Iran. According to the 2006 census, its population consisted of 9 families, with a total of 28 people.
