= Ahmad Ahmadi =

Iranian executioner and nurse (1885–1944)

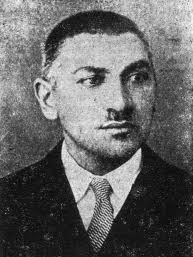
- Born: 1885; Mashhad, Iran
- Died: October 1944 (aged 58/59); Toopkhaneh, Tehran, Iran
- Status: Executed by hanging
- Conviction: Murder (2 counts)
- Penalty: Death

Details
- Country: Iran

Ahmad Ahmadi (Persian: احمد احمدی; 1885 – October 1944, known as Pezeshk Ahmadi meaning Physician Ahmadi) was an Iranian nurse. He was born in Mashhad to Mohammad Ali Ahmadi. He worked as a nurse at Qasr Prison in Tehran, where he was ordered to kill political prisoners; he was later executed for these crimes.

== Crimes ==
While he was employed at Tehran's Qasr prison, he was ordered to kill numerous political prisoners. Many political prisoners died under his notorious air injections. Some of the more famous were Mirza Mohammad Farrokhi Yazdi, Abdolhossein Teymourtash, Sardar As'ad and his brother Khānbābā Khān As'ad, Taghi Arani, and Ayatollah Mirza Mohammad Najafi Khorasani (Ayatollah Aghazadeh). Ahmadi was generally paid 10 to 15 Iranian tomans for every person he killed. If the victim was more prominent, he could be paid 100 tomans.

When the British and Soviets invaded Iran in 1941, Rezā Shāh of the Pahlavi dynasty was overthrown, and the judiciary, headed by Jalāl Abdeh, under popular pressure, was appointed to take many infamous figures such as Ahmadi to trial for their crimes during the first Pahlavi era.

== Trial and execution ==
After being released from eight years of exile in 1941, Iran Teymourtash travelled to Iraq and succeeded in arranging for Ahmadi's extradition to Iran on charges that he had killed her father, Abdolhossein Teymourtash.

Ahmadi, along with Sarpās Mokhtār (Central Police chief), Mostafā Rāsekh, and Hosein Niroumand, was arrested and tried for crimes committed during Rezā Shāh's reign. Ahmadi was found guilty of two murders by the court and was sentenced to death. He was hanged in public in October 1944 in Tehran's Toopkhāneh Square. Prior to his execution, officials allowed Ahmadi to make a final prayer and told him to repent. After praying, Ahmadi started shouting that he was a scapegoat. Officials cut him off midway through his speech.

"O people, I am not a murderer!... My only sin is that I have carried out the orders of my superiors... and now, because I am the weakest of all, everything has fallen on my shoulders... The main murderer of Brigadier Mukhtar and Reza Shah himself."

== See also ==
- Amir Abdollah Tahmasebi
- Abdolhossein Teymourtash
- Mahmud Khan Puladeen
- Colonel Pessian
