= Ahmadiyeh, Fahraj =

Ahmadiyeh احمديه
- Village
- Location within Iran
- Coordinates: 28°46′40″N 58°51′35″E
- Country: Iran
- Province: Kerman
- County: Fahraj
- Bakhsh: Central
- Rural District: Borj-e Akram

Population (2006)
  - Total: 100
- Time zone: UTC+3:30 (IRST)
  - Summer (DST): UTC+4:30 (IRDT)

Ahmadiyeh (Persian: احمديه, also Romanized as Aḩmadīyeh) is a village in Borj-e Akram Rural District, in the Central District of Fahraj County, Kerman Province, Iran. At the 2006 census, its population was 100, in 20 families.
