= Arayyez-e Ahmadi =

Arayyez-e Ahmadi عريض احمدي
- Village
- Location within Iran
- Coordinates: 31°22′04″N 49°26′59″E
- Country: Iran
- Province: Khuzestan
- County: Ramhormoz
- Bakhsh: Central
- Rural District: Howmeh-ye Gharbi

Population (2006)
  - Total: 271
- Time zone: UTC+3:30 (IRST)
  - Summer (DST): UTC+4:30 (IRDT)

Arayyez-e Ahmadi (Persian: عريض احمدي, also Romanized as ‘Arayyeẕ-e Aḩmadī; also known as Aḩmadī, Ahmadia, Aḩmadīyeh, Boneh-ye Aḩmadī, and Buneh-ye Ahmadī) is a village in Howmeh-ye Gharbi Rural District, in the Central District of Ramhormoz County, Khuzestan Province, Iran. At the 2006 census, its population was 271, in 48 families.
