= Iran Teymourtash =

Iranian activist (1914–1991)

Iran Teymourtāsh
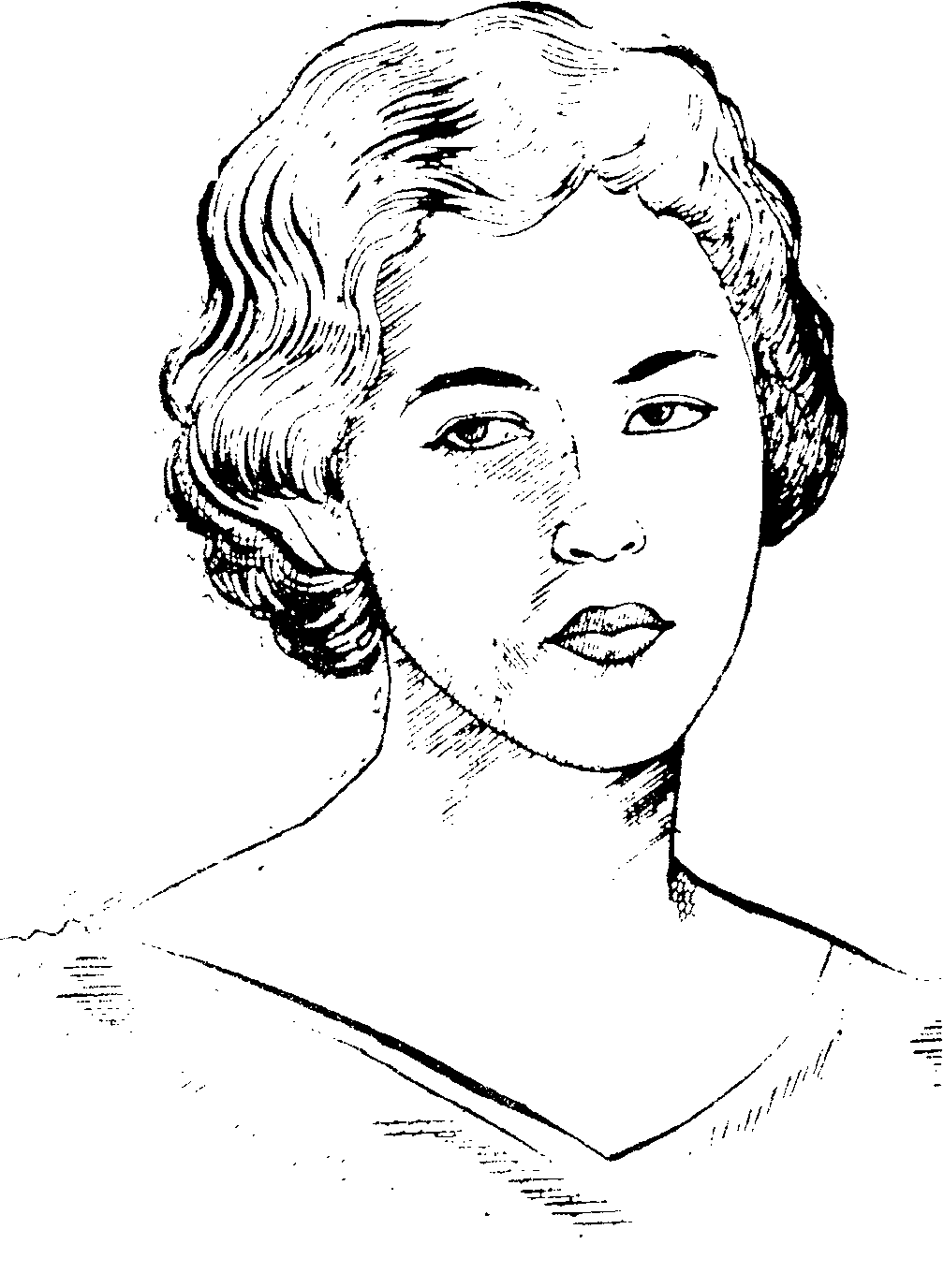
- a 1956 drawing of Iran Teymourtash
- Born: 1914, Kashmar; Nardein
- Died: 1991 (aged 76–77) , Paris
- Education: Iran Bethel School
- Known for: Activism, philanthropy
- Parent: Abdolhossein Teymourtāsh (father)

Iran Teymourtāsh (Persian: ایران تیمورتاش; 1914–1991, born in Nardein), the eldest daughter of statesman Abdolhossein Teymourtāsh, is considered a pioneer among women activists in 20th-century Iran. Her father's position as the second most powerful political personality in Iran, from 1925 to 1932, afforded Iran Teymourtāsh the opportunity to play a prominent role in that country's women's affairs early in life.

== Life ==
Prior to her father's removal from office in 1932, she attended the Iran Bethel School (also known as the American Girl's College in Tehran), and is believed to have been the first female to appear in public unveiled when she delivered the commencement address for her graduating class from high school in 1930. Shortly later, she founded an association of women with the intended goal of establishing a boarding school for destitute women. This organization would remain active in the years that followed by engaging in charitable work, and among others, establishing evening educational classes for women.

In 1931, Iran Teymourtāsh was sent abroad to attend preparatory college in London; however, after a year of attending college, she returned to Iran upon hearing that her father had been arrested on the orders of Reza Shah for having fallen out of favour. Abdolhossein Teymourtāsh was murdered in prison in 1933, and his immediate family was held under house arrest on one of its farflung estates for an extended period of time. While it was not uncommon for Reza Shah to imprison or kill previous associates or prominent politicians, the decision to impose severe collective punishment on Teymourtāsh's family was likely unprecedented during his reign. As such, Iran Teymourtāsh endured eight years of incarceration and exile with several other members of her family.

After being released from exile in 1941, Iran Teymourtāsh travelled to Iraq and succeeded in arranging for the extradition to Iran of the individual believed to have killed her father, Ahmad Ahmadi ("Pezeshk Ahmadi"), who was subsequently tried and sentenced in Tehran for having arranged the murder of various individuals at Qasr prison on the orders of Reza Shah. He was hanged in public in October 1944 in Tehran's Toopkhāneh Square.

Subsequently, given the flourishing of the free press in the period that followed the removal of Reza Shah from the throne, Iran Teymourtāsh served as the first female editor of an Iranian newspaper after she established and published the Rastakhiz newspaper. Nonetheless, within several years of publishing Rastakhiz, Iran sensed that freedom of the press was slowly deteriorating as Mohammad Reza Shah consolidated his hold on power, and she moved to Paris where she lived for the remainder of her life.

Iran Teymourtāsh earned a Ph.D. in literature while residing in France where she pursued a career in journalism, and acted briefly as the press attache at the Iranian embassy in Paris. She became an active member of PEN International and André Malraux's International Association of Writers for the Defense of Culture. Like her father, Iran Teymourtāsh was awarded France's highest civilian honour, the Legion d'honneur.

Apart from her brief engagement to Hossein Ali Qaragozlu before Abdolhossein Teymourtāsh's fall, Iran Teymourtāsh opted to remain single for the remainder of her life. The posthumous release in 1991 of the Confidential Diary of Asadollah Alam, the Shah's closest confidant, revealed that Mohammad Reza Pahlavi intimated to Alam that during his late teenage years he "was head over heels in love with Iran Teymourtash".

In 2009, a book chronicling the lives of Iran Teymourtash, Ashraf Pahlavi and Mariam Firouz, entitled In Se Zan (These Three Women) was authored by Masoud Behnoud and published to wide acclaim in Iran. It is believed to be one of the best selling books to have been published in Iran in recent memory.

== See also ==
- Islamic feminism

== Sources ==
- Agheli, Bagher, Teymourtash Dar Sahneye-h Siasate-h Iran ("Teimurtash in the Political Arena of Iran") (Javeed: Tehran, 1371).
- Behnoud, Masoud, Een Se Zan, Ashraf Pahlavi, Mariam Firouz, va Iran Teymourtash
- Cronin, Stephanie, The Making of Modern Iran: State and Society Under Reza Shah (Routledge: London, 2003) ISBN 0-415-30284-6.
