= 1934 in Iran =

- Decades
- See also: Other events of 1934; Years in Iran

The following lists events that happened during 1934 in Pahlavi Iran.

== Incumbents ==
- Shah: Reza Shah
- Prime Minister: Mohammad Ali Foroughi

== Births ==
- January 4 – Mohammad-Reza Bateni, Iranian Linguist, Writer and Translator.
- January 5 – Parviz Varjavand, Iranian archaeologist.
- January 8 – Jim Bakhtiar, Iranian gridiron football player.
- January 28 – Mohammad-Hossein Moeinpour, Iranian military officer.
- January 30 – Akbar Golpayegani, Iranian singer.
- February 1 – Bahman Forsi, Iranian writer, poet, actor and playwright.
- February 4 – Pouran (singer), Iranian singer.
- February 8 – Kazem Rajavi, Iranian politician.
- February 14 – Iraj Gorgin, Iranian journalist and voice actor.
- March 6 – Asadollah Asgaroladi, Iranian businessman.
- March 20 – Fahimeh Rastkar, Iranian actress.
- March 26 – Manouchehr Boroumand, Iranian weightlifter.
- April 8 – Vartan Gregorian, American academic administrator.
- April 10 – Cyrus Amouzgar, Iranian journalist, writer, politician, essayist and playwright.
- April 22 – Ahmad NikTalab, Iranian poet, author, and linguistic.
- April 22 – Babak NikTalab, Poet of children and adolescent literature.
- April 28 – Dariush Borbor, Iranian architect.
- May 19 – Hassan Pakandam, Iranian Olympic boxer.
- May 26 – Homa Nategh, History Professor.
- June 10 – Mohammad Shahcheraghi, Iranian Ayatollah.
- June 13 – Rahim Rahmanzadeh, Iranian surgeon.
- July 2 – Jafar Namdar, Iranian football referee.
- July 3 – Ezaria Ilkhanoff, Iranian boxer.
- August 15 – Ebrahim Abadi, Iranian actor.
- August 23 – Mahmoud Seraji, Iranian poet.
- August 25 – Akbar Hashemi Rafsanjani, Iranian politician.
- September 13 – Hossein Yazdi, Iranian journalist.
- November 10 – Davoud Hermidas-Bavand, Iranian politician.
- November 26 – Gholamhossein Ebrahimi Dinani, Iranian philosopher.
- November 26 – Jamshid Mashayekhi, Iranian actor.
- ? – Abolghasem Wafi Yazdi, Iranian Ayatollah.
- ? – Ali Banihashemi, Iranian amateur wrestler.
- ? – Amnon Netzer, Iranian historian.
- ? – Elaheh, Iranian singer.
- ? – Hasan Anvari, retired Iranian professor of Persian literature and lexicographer.
- ? – Hassan Sane'i, Iranian Shi'a cleric.
- ? – Hossein Mazaheri, Iranian ayatollah.
- ? – Kazem Sami, Iranian politician.
- ? – Mahtab Norouzi, Iranian Baluchi handicraft artist.
- ? – Mansoureh Ettehadieh, Iranian historian and publisher.

== Deaths ==
- January 21 – Aref Qazvini, Iranian poet, lyricist and musician.
- March 20 – Ashraf Gilani, Iranian literary, poet, journalist and cleric.
- June 26 – Asghar the Murderer, Iranian serial killer.
- September 25 – Ali Mojuz, Iranian Azerbaijani poet.
- ? – Mirza Yusif khan Mammadbeyov, Azerbaijani engineer, statesman.
