= Liberalism in Iran =

Overview of Iranian liberalism

Liberalism in Iran (Persian: لیبرالیسم, romanized: Liberālism) or Iranian liberalism (Persian: آزادی‌خواهی, romanized: Āzādi-khāhi, lit. 'freedom-seeking') is a political ideology that began in the 20th century. It first emerged during the Constitutional Revolution through movements such as the Society for the Supporters of Progress, which promoted civil liberties, women's education, Persian linguistic unity, and democratic governance. In the 1920s, liberal and reformist ideas were advanced by the Revival Party, whose Western-educated leaders championed secular modernization, administrative reform, industrialization, and the separation of religion and politics while supporting Reza Khan's consolidation of power. By mid-century, the Iran Party, largely composed of technocratic elites, became the intellectual backbone of the National Front, advocating liberal nationalism, democratic socialism, and secular constitutionalism. Under Mohammad Mosaddegh, the National Front implemented progressive reforms and nationalized Iran's oil industry before being removed in the 1953 CIA- and MI6-backed coup.

In the decades leading up to and following the Iranian Revolution, liberalism persisted through groups such as the Freedom Movement of Iran, which combined Islamic modernism with constitutionalism, human rights, and political pluralism. Although it supported the 1979 Revolution's initial call for political change, it soon faced repression under the new Islamic Republic. Other liberal or center-left movements, including the National Democratic Front, briefly appeared during the revolutionary transition but were swiftly banned.

Throughout the 20th century, Iranian liberalism consistently emphasized constitutional rule, civil rights, women's rights, limits on authoritarian authority, and resistance to foreign domination, yet its major organizations were repeatedly suppressed by both monarchical and theocratic regimes.

== Iranian Liberalism during 1900–1979 ==
=== Society for the Progress of Iran ===
During the constitutional period of Persia and active during the 2nd term of Majlis, 1909–1911, the party Society of the Supporters for Progress championed the development of the southern provinces of Persia and consisted of Members of Parliament representing the southern regions. They promoted building hospitals, women's education, and regarded Persian as "the official and scholarly" language of Iran. The party was liberal Islamic, nationalist, constitutionalist and anti-imperialist.

Its publication, Jonub (lit. 'The South'), was printed in Tehran and usually criticized Bakhtiaris, and held the view that the Iranian government does not understand the importance of the Persian Gulf region. The newspaper defended democracy and civil rights and explained that the "level of progress of any nation is symbolized in its degree of freedom of expression and press" and that the elections are the only means to exercise popular sovereignty and protect territorial integrity as well as national interests.

The party was small and insignificant in numbers, but helped hold the balance of power in the 2nd Majlis, allying with the Moderate Socialists Party and Union and Progress Party against the Democrat Party.

=== Revival Party ===
During 1920s, the secular progressive Revival Party or Modernity Party was formed by young western-educated reformists, it was mainly organized by Ali Akbar Davar, Mohammad Tadayon, and Abdolhossein Teymourtash, and was led by former Democrat Party politicians who had lost confidence in the masses. This was in contrast to the Socialist Party which was led by former Democrats who retained hope to mobilize the working class. Many constitutionalist veterans were associated with the party, including Mohammad Ali Foroughi, Mostowfi ol-Mamalek, Hassan Taqizadeh, Mohammad-Taqi Bahar, and Ebrahim Hakimi. The party also had liberal and nationalist tendencies, it supported Reza Khan and helped him become the new Shah of Iran while holding a majority in the parliament.

The party's platform was based on "separation of religion and politics, creating a strong army, an efficient administrative system, ending the regime of capitulations, industrialization, replacing foreign capital, transforming nomadic citizens into farmers, development of a progressive income tax system, educational facilities open to the public (including women), talent-driven career opportunities, and the promotion of Persian language over local minority languages".

=== National Front of Iran ===
Founded by Mohammad Mosaddegh in 1949, the National Front of Iran is the oldest and arguably the largest pro-democracy group operating inside Iran, although it has never recovered its prominence from the early 1950s. Before 1953 and throughout the 1960s, the front was torn by strife between secular and religious elements, over time, it has splintered into various squabbling factions, gradually emerging as the leading organization of secular liberals with nationalist members adhering to liberal democracy and social democracy. Amid the Iranian Revolution, the front supported replacing the old monarchy with an Islamic Republic and was the main symbol of "nationalist" tendency in the early years of post-revolutionary government. It was banned in July 1981, but despite officially remaining illegal and under constant surveillance, is still active inside Iran.

Prominent members include Mohammad Mosaddegh (leader of the party during 1949–1960), Allah-Yar Saleh (leader during 1960–1964), Karim Sanjabi (leader during 1967–1988), Adib Boroumand (leader during 1993–2017), and Davoud Hermidas-Bavand (current spokesperson).

Mohammad Mosaddegh served as the Prime Minister of Iran from 1951 until 1953, when his government was overthrown in a coup d'état aided by the United States' Central Intelligence Agency and the United Kingdom's Secret Intelligence Service. An author, administrator, lawyer, and prominent parliamentarian, his administration introduced a range of progressive social and political reforms, such as social security and land reforms, including taxation of the rent on land. His government's most notable policy, however, was the nationalization of the Iranian oil industry, which had been under British control since 1913 through the Anglo-Persian Oil Company (APOC/AIOC) (later British Petroleum and BP).

Many Iranians regard Mosaddegh as the leading champion of secular democracy and resistance to foreign domination in Iran's modern history. Mosaddegh was removed from power in a coup on 19 August 1953, organized and carried out by the CIA at the request of MI6, which chose Iranian General Fazlollah Zahedi to succeed Mosaddegh. While the coup is commonly referred to in the West as Operation Ajax after its CIA cryptonym, in Iran it is referred to as the 28 Mordad 1332 coup, its date on the Iranian calendar.

=== Iran Party ===
Established in 1949, the Iran Party is described as the "backbone of the National Front", the leading umbrella organization of Iranian nationalists. Founded by mostly European-educated technocrats, it advocated "a diluted form of French socialism" (i.e., it "modeled itself on" the moderate Socialist Party of France) and promoted social democracy, liberal nationalism, and secularism. The socialist tent of the party was more akin to that of the Fabian Society than to the scientific socialism of Karl Marx. Its focus on liberal socialism and democratic socialism principles made it quite different from pure left-wing parties, and it did not show much involvement in labour rights discussions. The Iran Party's basic nucleus consisted of members of the Iranian Engineers' Association. In the 1944 legislative election, five of the party's leaders, including Rezazadeh Shafaq, Ghulam'Ali Farivar, AhdulHamid Zanganeh, Hussein Mu'aven, and Abdallah Mu'azemi won seats, along with Mohammad Mossadegh, whose platform and policies were supported by the party.

The party helped Mossadegh establish the National Front, nationalize the oil industry, and aided his rise to power. Some members held office during the Mosaddegh government. In the 1950s, the party was led by Karim Sanjabi and Allah-Yar Saleh. It was suppressed following the British–American backed coup d'état in 1953 and was outlawed in 1957, on the grounds that it had an alliance with the Tudeh Party of Iran ten years earlier. It was revived in 1960 and actively contributed to the National Front (II), which disintegrated in 1963 and was forced to operate in secret.

The Iran Party held a congress in 1964. Not much is known about the activities of the party between 1964 and the mid-1970s except for some irregular meetings and exchange of views. In 1977, alongside the League of Socialists and the Nation Party, it revived the National Front (IV) and demanded Ruhollah Khomeini's return to Iran. In early 1979, then secretary-general of the party, Shapour Bakhtiar, was appointed as the last Prime Minister by the Shah and included two Iran Party members in his cabinet. The party, however, denounced his acceptance of the post, expelled him, and called him a "traitor". The party did not play an important role in the Iranian political arena after 1979 and was soon declared banned.

=== People's Party ===
Founded on May 16, 1957 in the Pahlavi era, the People's Party (Mardom) was one of two major parties in an apparent attempt to establish a two-party system by the Shah, in opposition to the ruling New Iran Party and, previously, the Party of Nationalists. The party was dissolved in 1975, and merged into the newly founded Resurgence Party, the only legal party in the attempted single-party system.

=== Freedom Movement of Iran ===
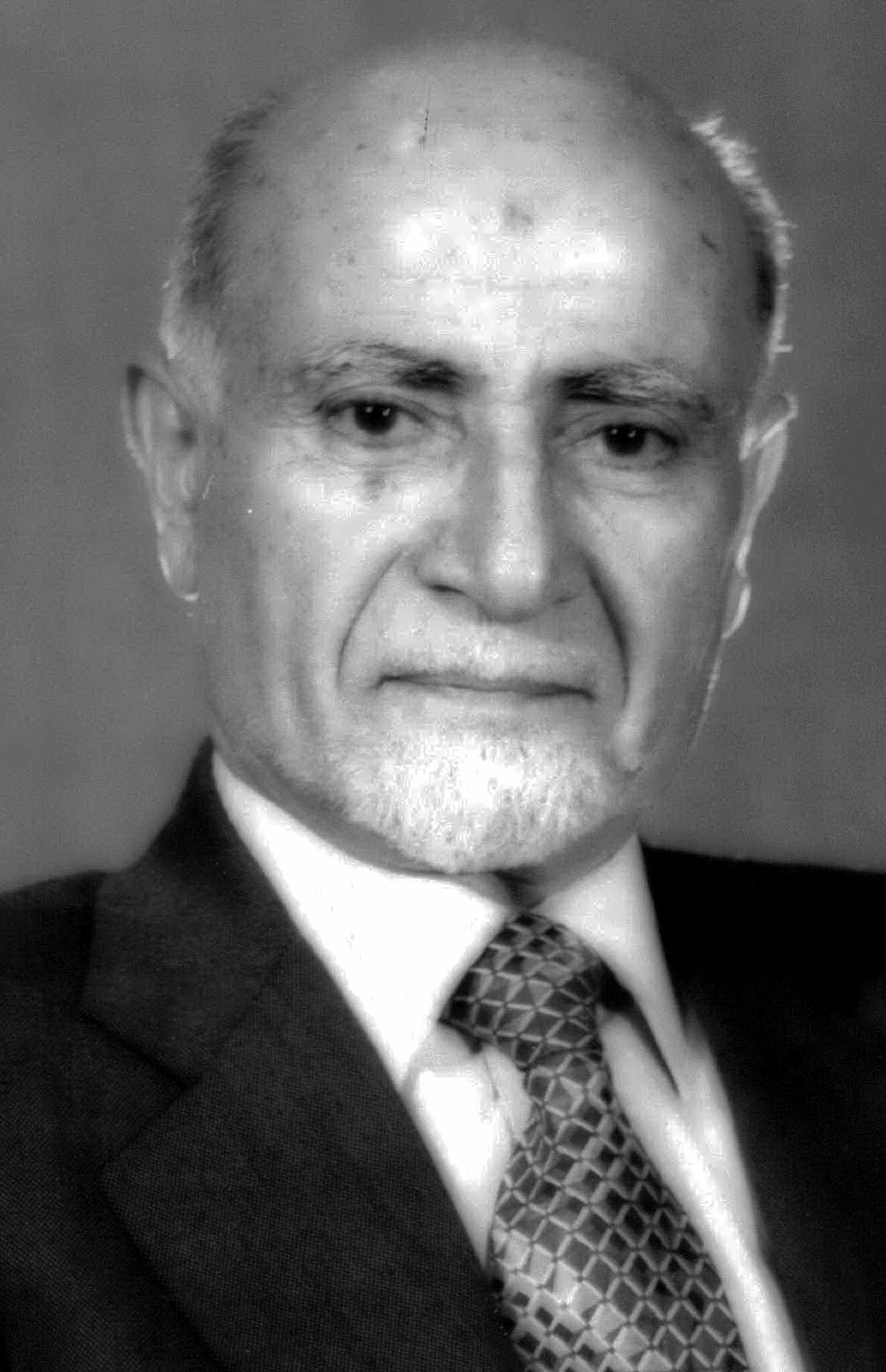
Mehdi Bazargan

Founded in 1961, the Freedom Movement of Iran (FMI) is an Iranian pro-democracy political organization; its members describe themselves as "Muslims, Iranians, Constitutionalists and Mossadeghists". A split to the National Front (II), the party was established with support and blessings of Mohammad Mossadegh and soon applied for the membership in the front with a platform advocating national sovereignty, freedom of political activity and expression, social justice under Islam, respect for Iran's constitution, the Universal Declaration of Human Rights, and the Charter of the United Nations. It believed in the separation of church and state, while also believing that political activity should be guided by religious values. The party's ideologies are Iranian nationalism, Islamic democracy, Islamic liberalism and constitutionalism.

Despite being outlawed by the prevailing regime in Iran, the group continues to exist. The organization accepts to comply with the Constitution of the Islamic Republic of Iran despite its rejection of Guardianship of the Islamic Jurist. It has been described as a "semi-opposition" or "loyal opposition" party. The organization's members have close ties to the Council of Nationalist-Religious Activists of Iran.

Prominent members are Mehdi Bazargan, Ebrahim Yazdi, Mostafa Chamran, Sadegh Ghotbzadeh and Ali Shariati.

Mehdi Bazargan (September 1, 1907 – January 20, 1995), an Iranian scholar, academic, and long-time pro-democracy activist, was head of Iran's interim government, making him Iran's first prime minister after the Iranian Revolution of 1979. He resigned his position as prime minister in November 1979, in protest of the US Embassy takeover and as an acknowledgement of his government's failure in preventing it. He was the head of the first engineering department of the University of Tehran.

Bazargan is considered to be a respected figure within the ranks of modern Muslim thinkers, well known as a representative of liberal-democratic Islamic thought and a thinker who emphasized the necessity of constitutional and democratic policies. In the immediate aftermath of the revolution, Bazargan led a faction that opposed the Revolutionary Council dominated by the Islamic Republican Party and personalities such as Ayatollah Mohammad Hossein Beheshti. He opposed the continuation of the Iran–Iraq War and the involvement of clerics in all aspects of politics, economy and society. Consequently, he faced harassment from militants and young revolutionaries within Iran.

== Liberalism in the Islamic Republic: 1979–present ==
=== National Democratic Front ===
During the Iranian Revolution of 1979 that overthrew Shah Mohammad Reza Pahlavi, the liberal-left National Democratic Front was founded by Hedayatollah Matin-Daftari. Matin-Daftari was a grandson of celebrated Iranian nationalist Mohammad Mosaddeq and a "lawyer who had been active in human rights causes" before the downfall of the Shah and the son of fourth prime minister and jurist Ahmad Matin-Daftari. The party was banned within a short time by the Islamic government. Though it was short-lived, the party has been described as one of "the three major movements of the political center" in Iran at that time.

The NDF "emphasized political freedoms, guarantees for individual rights, access for all political groups to the broadcast media, the curbing of the Revolutionary Guards, revolutionary courts, and revolutionary committees". Its economic programs favored "the mass of the people", and it supported a "decentralized system of administration based on popularly elected local councils."

Along with the Fadayan and some Kurdish groups, the NDF boycotted the March 30, 31, 1979 referendum on making Iran an Islamic Republic (the Referendum of 12 Farvardin). In the debate over Iran's new revolutionary constitution, it supported a parliamentary democracy with equal rights for women, adoption of the universal declaration of human rights and limited presidential powers. "Expressing concern over the freedom of elections and government control over the broadcast media," along with the National Front they announced they would boycott the election for the 1st Assembly of Experts, which wrote the new constitution.

=== Iranian reformists ===
The Reformists (Persian: اصلاح‌طلبان, romanized: Eslâh-Talabân) are an Islamic liberal political faction in Iran that emerged from a segment of Islamist revolutionaries in the years following the 1979 Iranian Revolution, who were collectively known as the Islamic Republic Left. Iran's "reform era" is sometimes said to have lasted from 1997 to 2005—the length of President Mohammad Khatami's two terms in office. The Council for Coordinating the Reforms Front is the main umbrella organization and coalition within the movement; however, there are reformist groups not aligned with the council, such as the Reformists Front. Masoud Pezeshkian, a reformist, was elected president following the 2024 Iranian presidential election, and was subsequently confirmed by Supreme Leader Ali Khamenei on 28 July.

According to political research and opinion surveys, the ideological orientation of the Reformist faction in Iran is generally close to social democracy and progressive democratic traditions, although a minority of its members identify more closely with liberal democracy or social liberalism.

==== Executives of Construction of Iran Party ====
In 1996, the Executives of Construction Party was founded by 16 members of the cabinet of the then President Akbar Hashemi Rafsanjani. The party is a member of the Council for coordinating the Reforms Front.

Economically, the party supports free markets and industrialization, with a high emphasis on progress and development. The party's ideologies are reformism, pragmatism, technocracy and liberal democracy. It takes the view that economic freedom is fundamentally linked to cultural and political freedom, but it should not be allowed to conflict with development. The party is divided into two factions in constant struggle, the more conservative "Kermani faction" led by Mohammad Hashemi Rafsanjani and Hossein Marashi and the more liberal "Isfahani faction" led by Mohammad Atrianfar and Gholamhossein Karbaschi.

== Women's rights ==
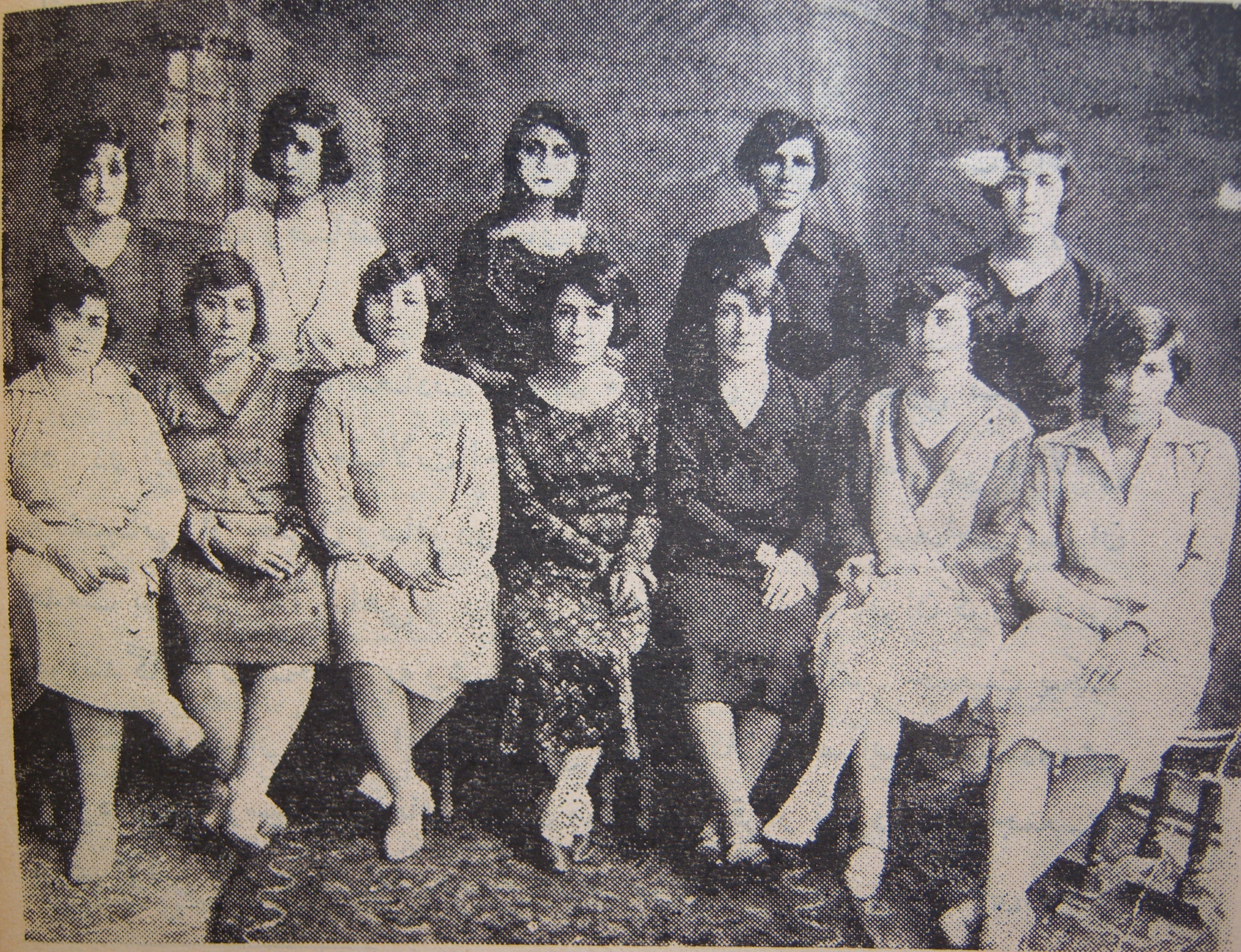
The board of directors of "Jam'iat e nesvan e vatan-khah", a women's rights association in Tehran (1923–1933)

The Iranian women's movement involves the movement for women's rights and women's equality in Iran. The movement first emerged some time after the Iranian Constitutional Revolution. The first journal published by a woman in Iran was Danesh, started in 1910. The movement lasted until 1933 when the last women's association was dissolved by Reza Shah's government. It heightened again after the Iranian Revolution (1979). Between 1962 and 1978, the Iranian women's movement gained tremendous victories: women won the right to vote in 1963 as part of Mohammad Reza Shah's White Revolution, and were allowed to stand for public office, and in 1975, the Family Protection Law provided new rights for women, including expanded divorce and custody rights and reduced polygamy. In 1969, women even began to drive cars and the first woman to ever drive a car in Iran was Eileen Zayer from the United States. Following the 1979 Revolution, several laws were established such as the introduction of mandatory veiling and a public dress code for females. Women's rights since the Islamic Revolution have varied. In November 2016, about 6% of Iranian parliament members were women, while the global average was about 23%.

== Political freedom and dissent ==
In a 2008 report, the organization Human Rights Watch complained that "broadly worded 'security laws'" in Iran are used "to arbitrarily suppress and punish individuals for peaceful political expression, association, and assembly, in breach of international human rights treaties to which Iran is party." For example, "connections to foreign institutions, persons, or sources of funding" are enough to bring criminal charges such as "undermining national security" against individuals.

Regarding the gradual unraveling of the reformist movement, an article from The Economist magazine said,

The Tehran spring of ten years ago has now given way to a bleak political winter. The new government continues to close down newspapers, silence dissenting voices and ban or censor books and websites. The peaceful demonstrations and protests of the Khatami era are no longer tolerated: in January 2007 security forces attacked striking bus drivers in Tehran and arrested hundreds of them. In March, police beat hundreds of men and women who had assembled to commemorate International Women's Day.

Although relatively peaceful when compared to the state-sponsored assassinations that occurred in the first decade of the Islamic Republic, throughout the 1990s the theocratic regime rarely hesitated to apply violent tactics to crush its political adversaries, with demonstrators and dissidents commonly being imprisoned, beaten, tortured or murdered ("disappeared").

The Iran student riots, July 1999 were sparked following an attack by an estimated 400 paramilitary Hezbollah vigilantes on a student dormitory in retaliation for a small, peaceful student demonstration against the closure of the reformist newspaper, Salam, earlier that day." At least twenty people were hospitalized and hundreds were arrested," in the attack. Ahmad Batebi, a demonstrator in the July 1999 Iranian student riots, received a death sentence for "propaganda against the Islamic Republic System." (His sentence was later reduced to 15, and then ten years imprisonment.)

== Prominent figures ==
=== Secular liberals ===
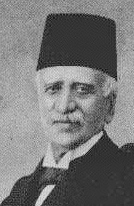
Mirza Malkam Khan

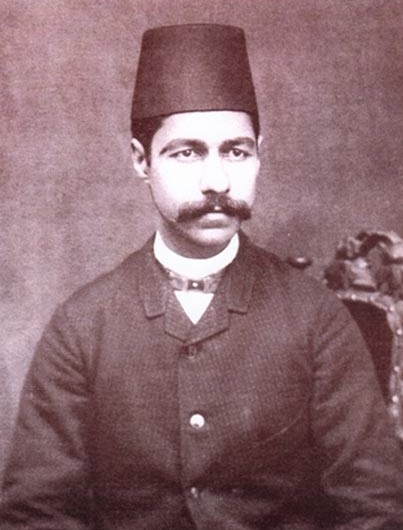
Mirza Aqa Khan Kermani

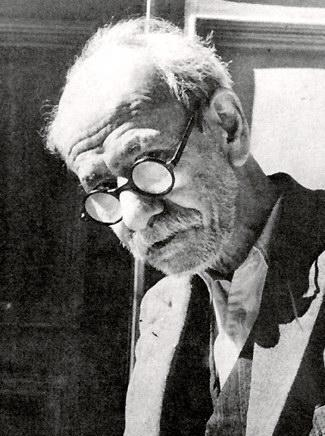
Ali-Akbar Dehkhoda

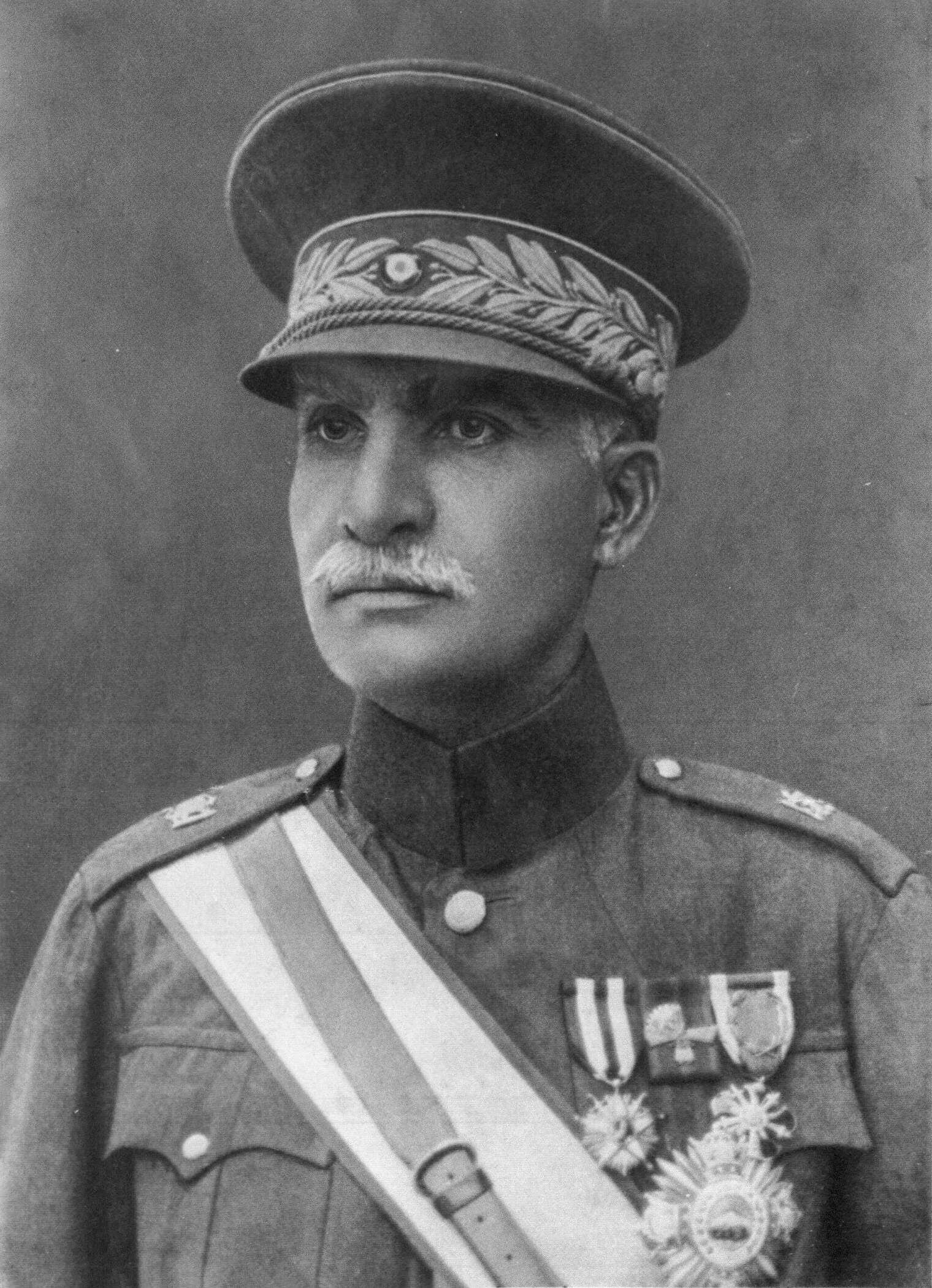
Shah Reza Pahlavi (Note: Reza Pahlavi was administratively conservative/authoritarian but socially liberal and secular; he was also supported by radical liberals from the days of the Qazaar, unlike his son, Mohammad Reza Pahlavi.)

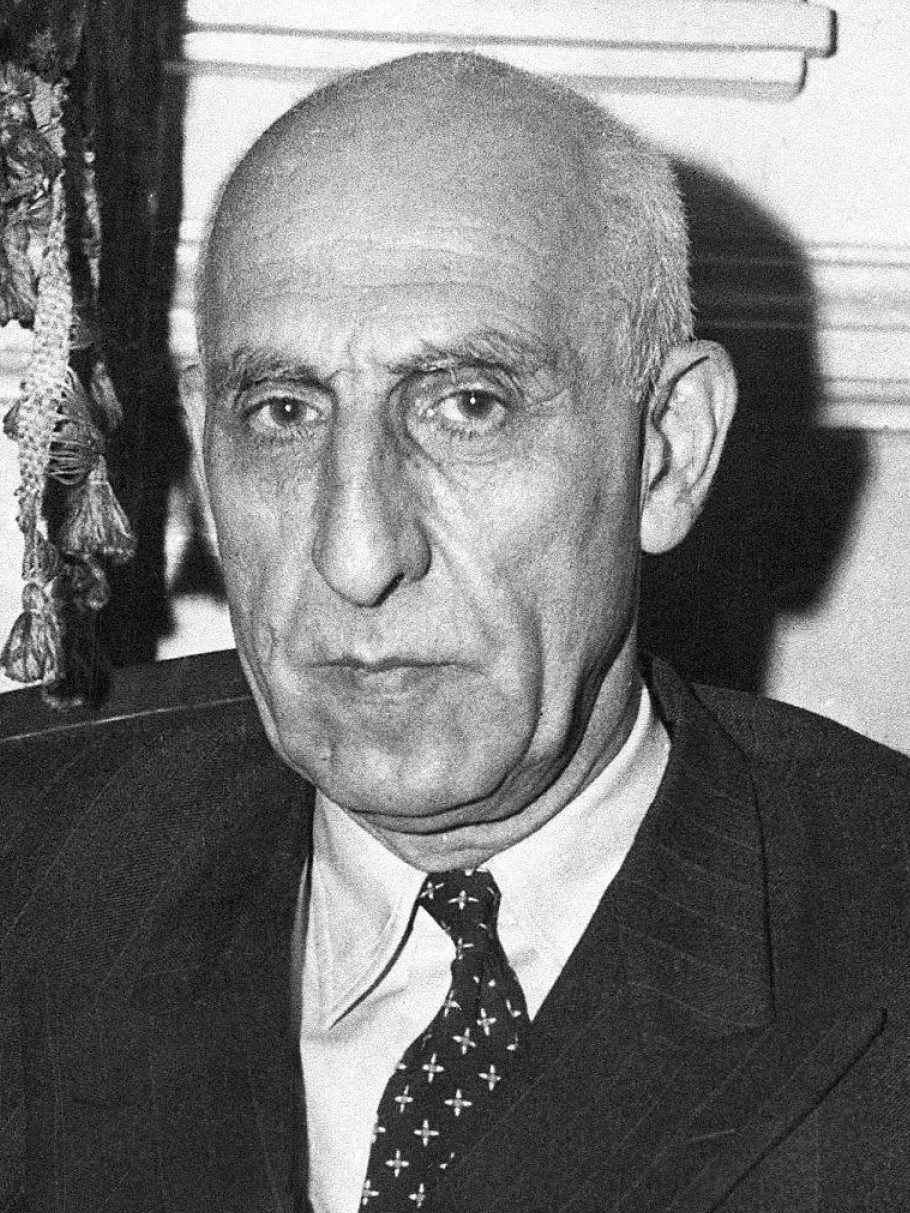
Prime Minister Mohammad Mosaddegh

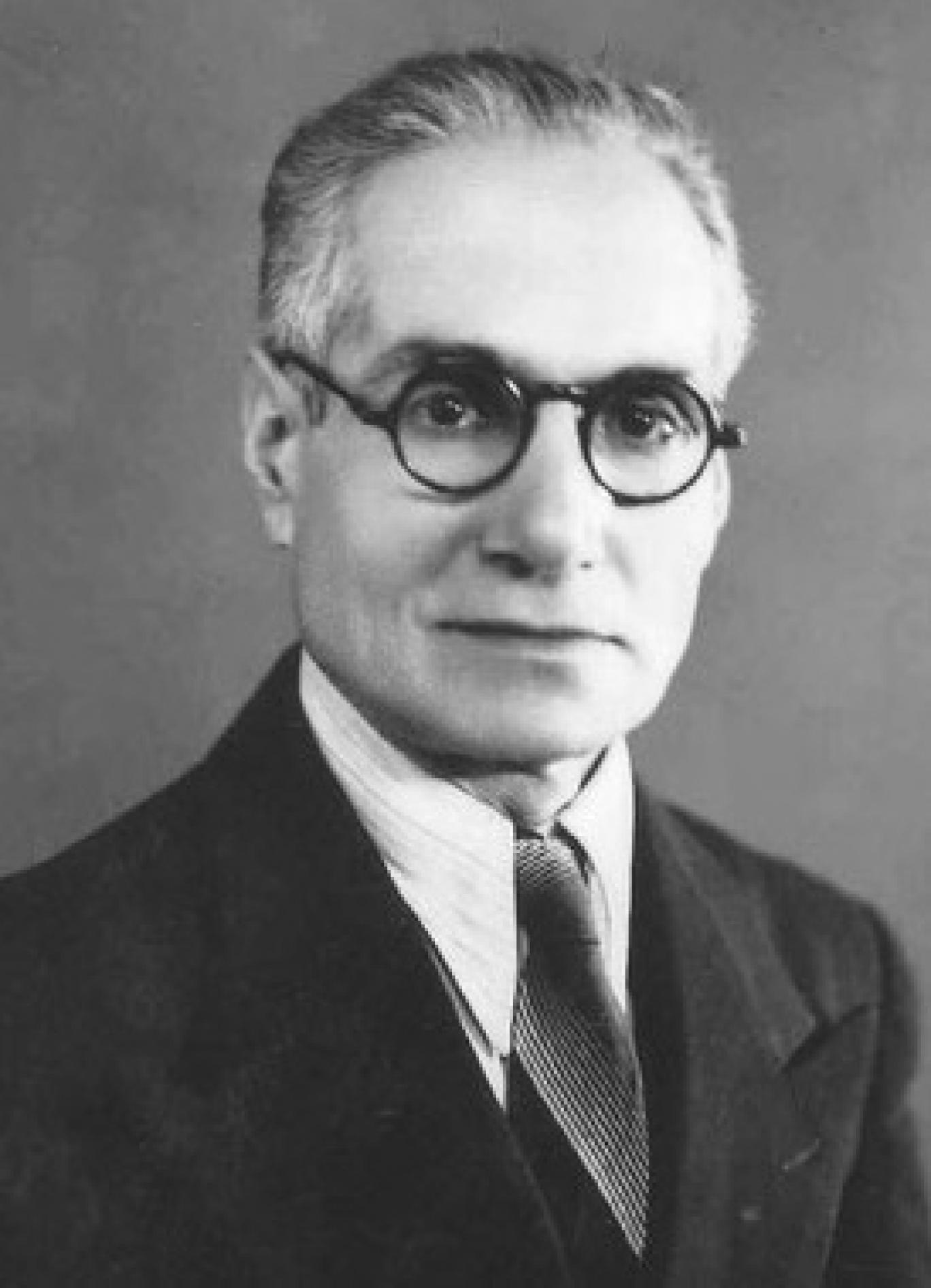
Ahmad Kasravi

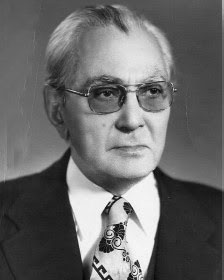
Karim Sanjabi

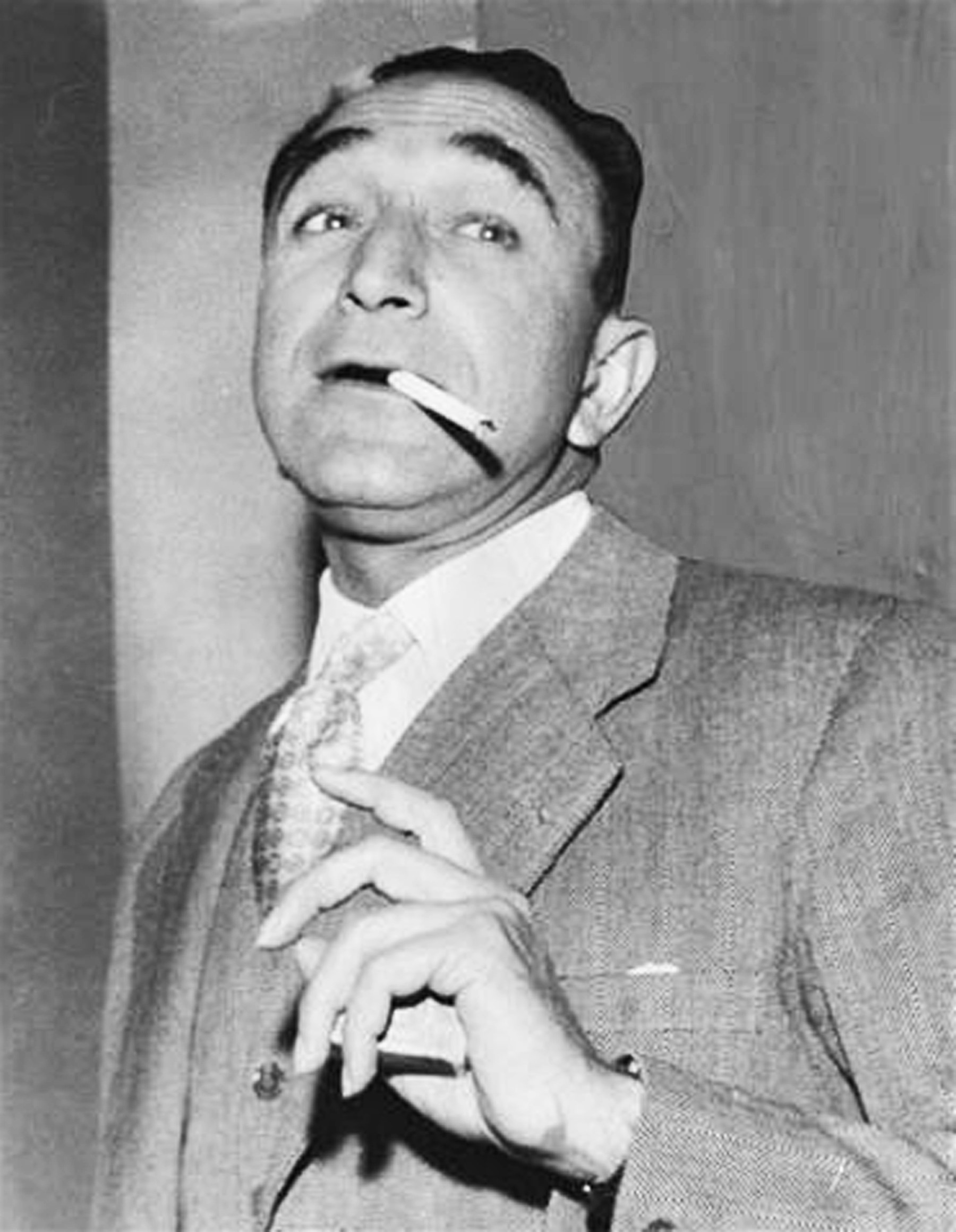
Prime Minister Asadollah Alam

Prime Minister Shapour Bakhtiar

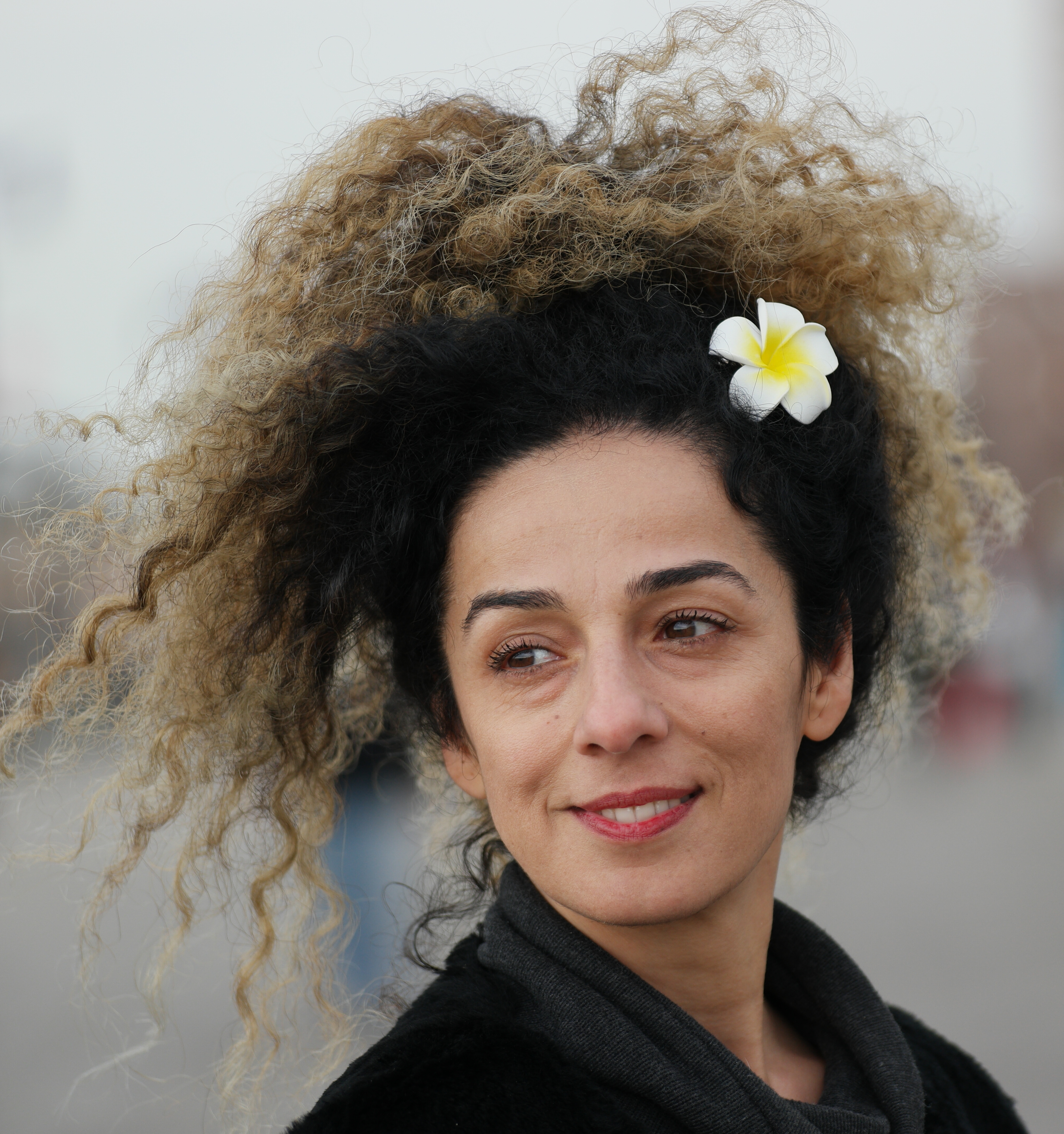
Masih Alinejad

=== Islamic liberals ===
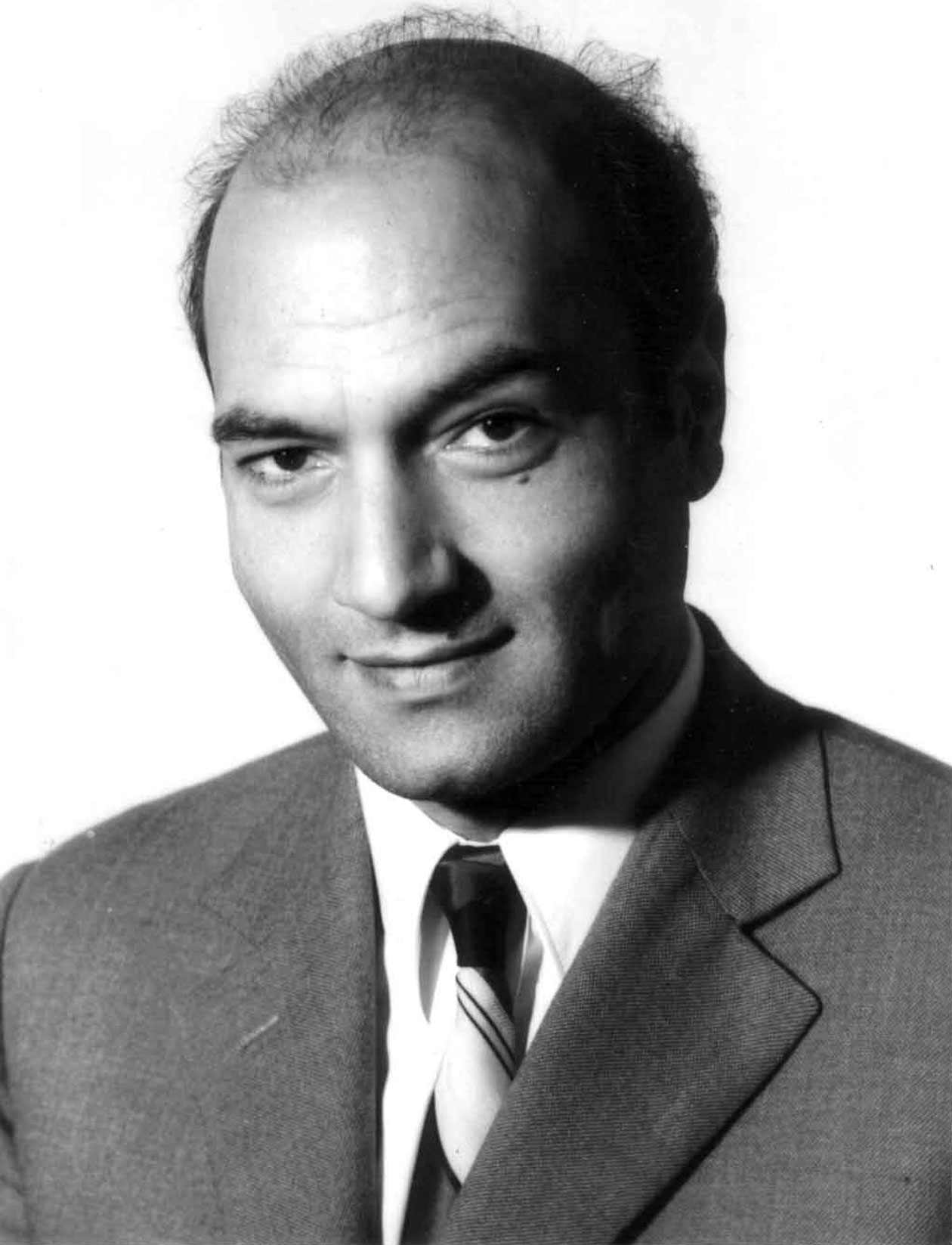
Ali Shariati (Note: Shariati was a theological liberal within Islam, but politically he was a socialist and skeptical view of Western liberal democracy.)

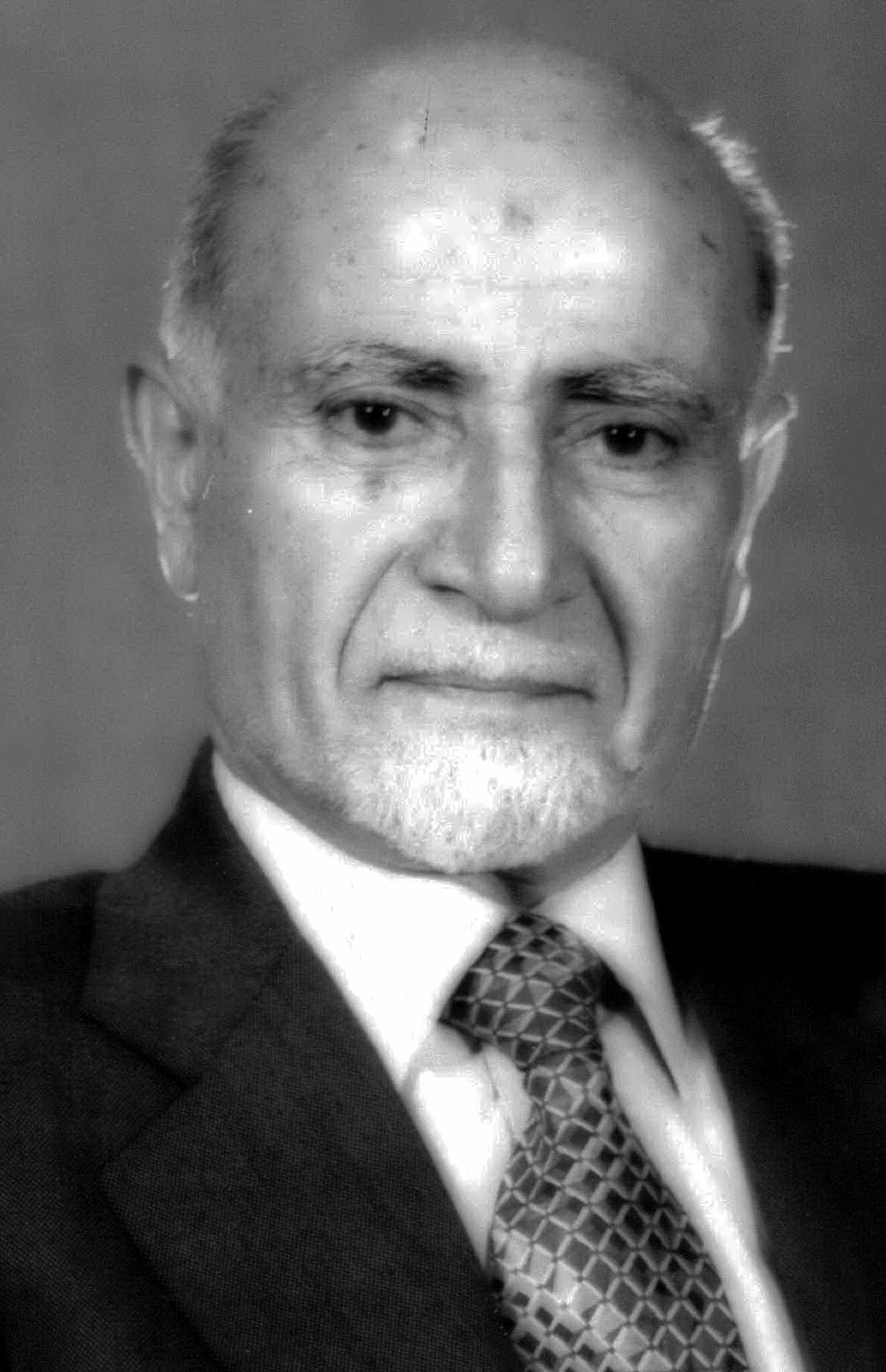
Prime Minister Mehdi Bazargan

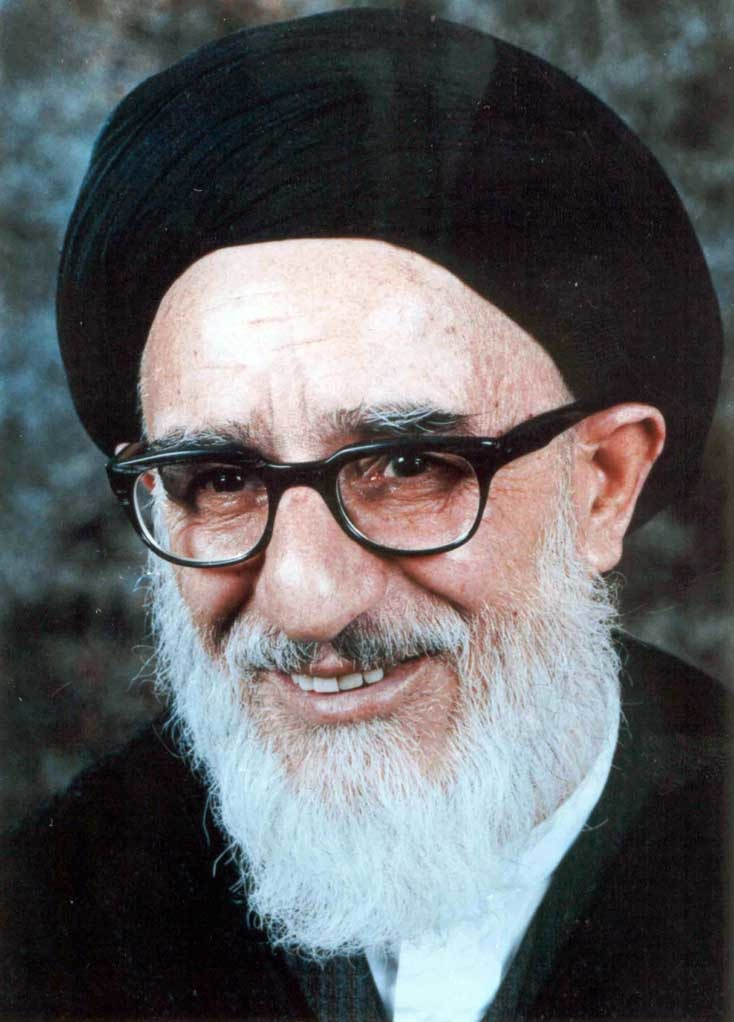
Mahmoud Taleghani

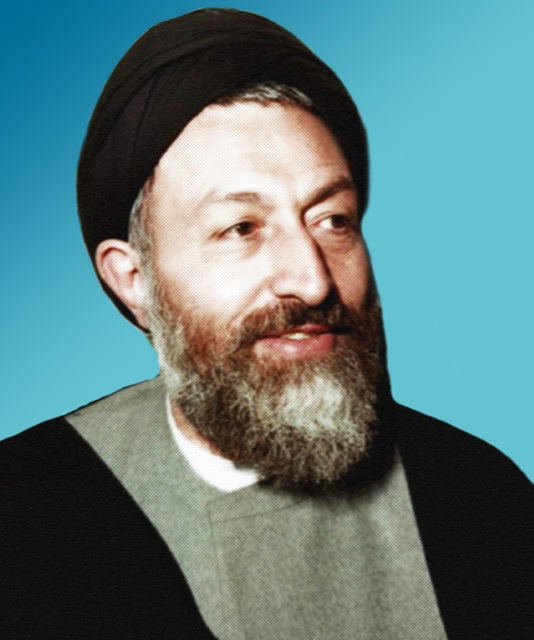
Mohammad Beheshti

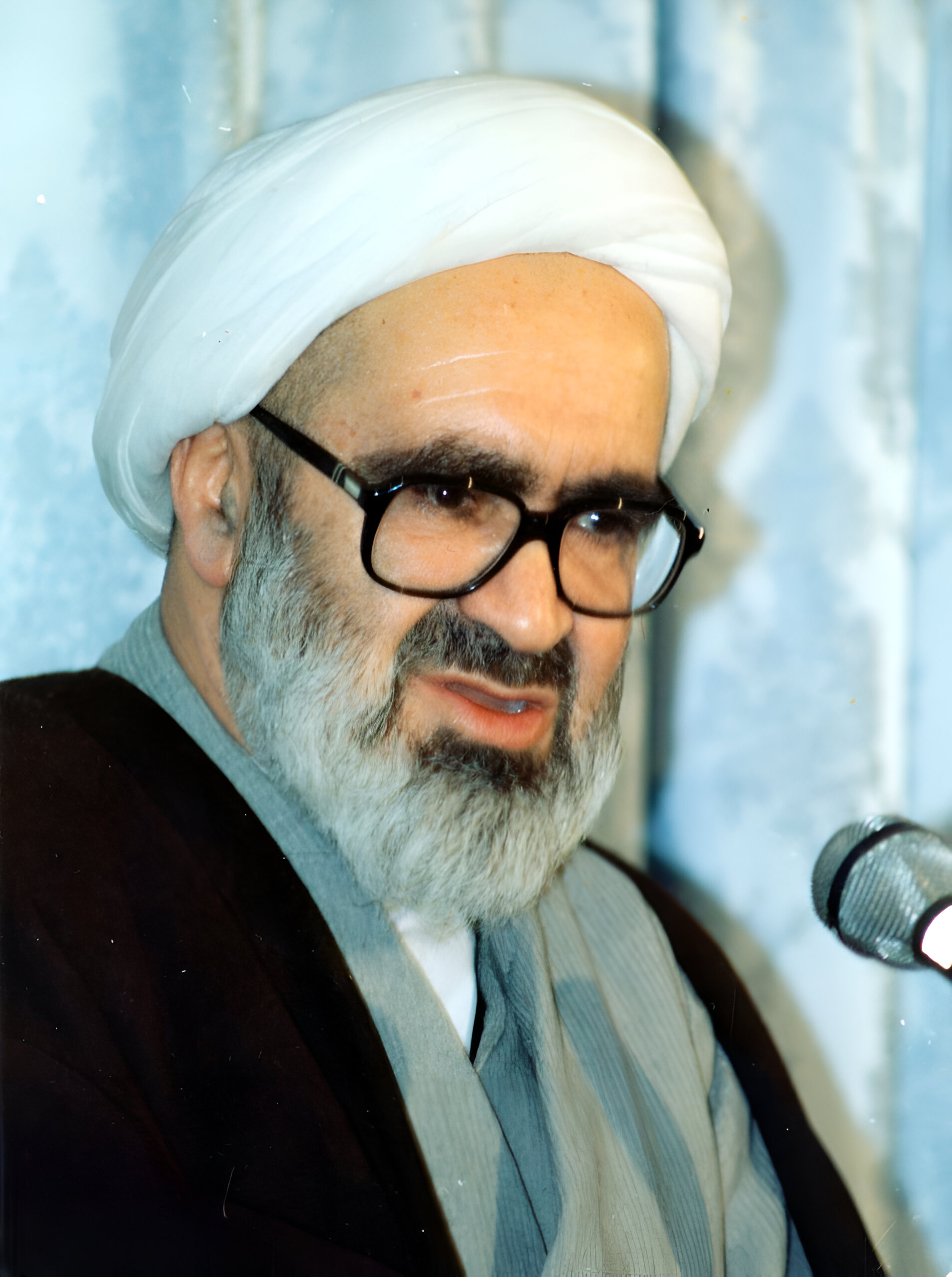
Hussein-Ali Montazeri

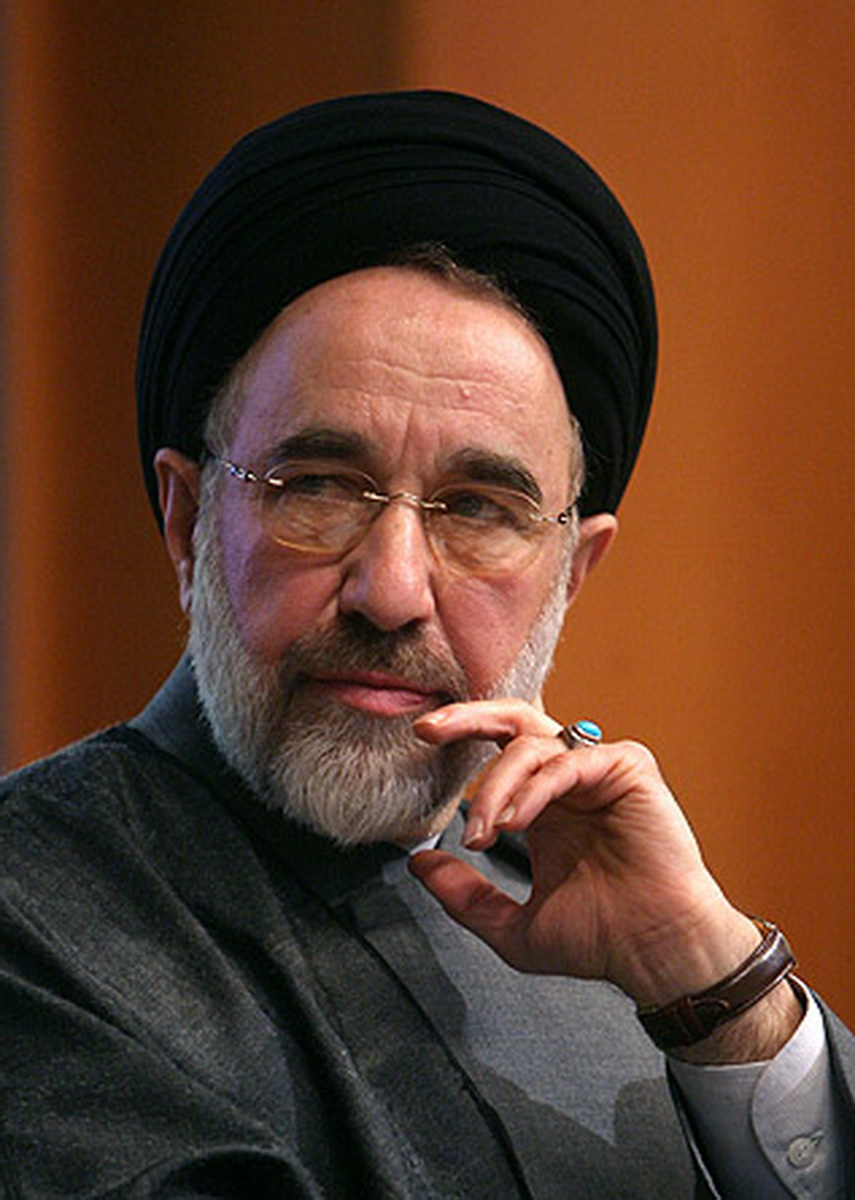
President Mohammad Khatami

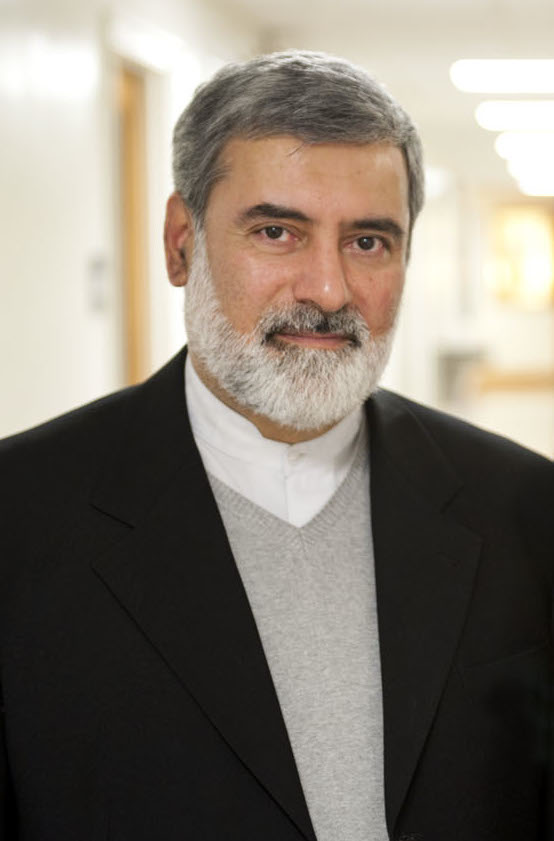
Mohsen Kadivar (Note: He belongs to the Iranian opposition, rather than Iranian reformists.)

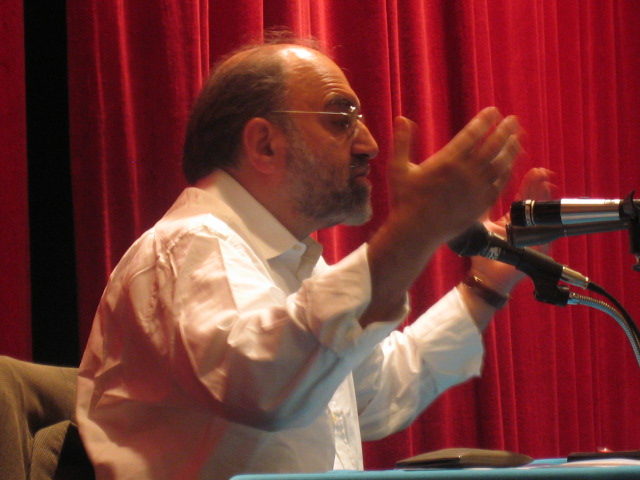
Abdolkarim Soroush

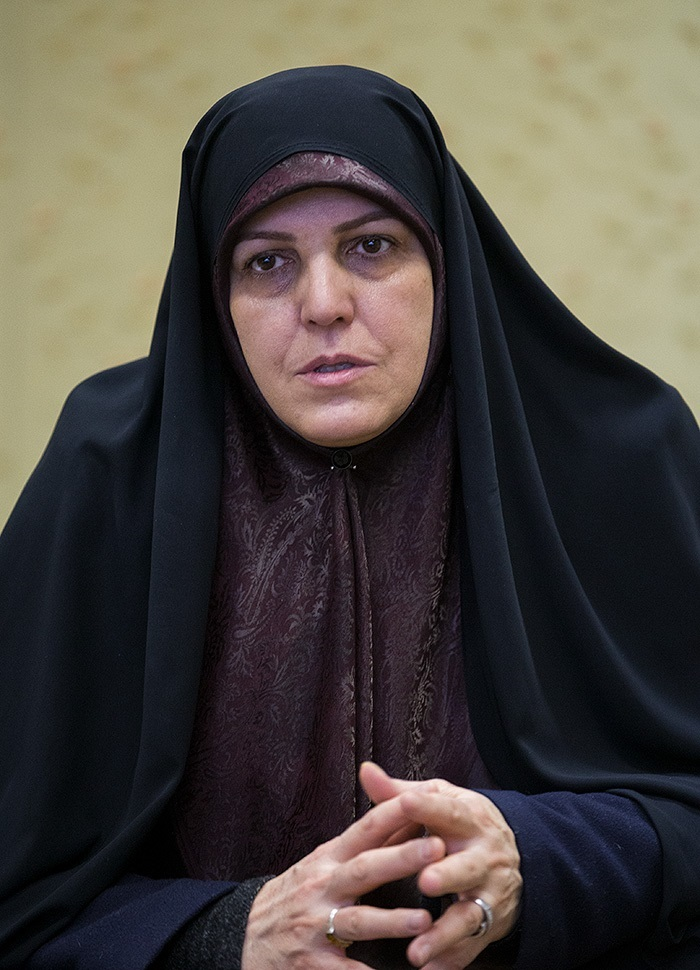
Shahindokht Molaverdi

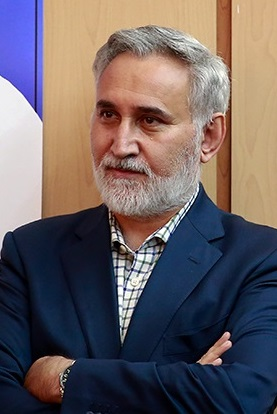
Mohammad-Reza Khatami

== See also ==
- Chain murders of Iran
- Conservatism in Iran
- History of Iran
- Intellectual movements in Iran
- Iranian opposition
- Iranian pragmatists
- Iranian nationalism
- List of Iranian defectors
- List of political parties in Iran
- Mosaddeghism
- Politics of Iran
- Shia opposition to the Islamic Republic of Iran

== Bibliography ==
- Richards, Alan. A Political Economy of the Middle East 2nd Ed. Westview Press Boulder, CO 1998
- Postel, Danny. Reading 'Legitimation Crisis' in Tehran, Prickly Paradigm Press
- Iran Enters the Liberalism Era Archived 2016-03-03 at the Wayback Machine, Iran Press Service, July 3, 2006
- Codrescu, Andrei., Liberalism in Iran, Monterey County Weekly, January 11, 2007
- Walking the Tightrope, The New Humanist Vol. 121 Issue 5 September/October 2006
- 'Alí Rizā Awsatí (عليرضا اوسطى), Iran in the Past Three Centuries (Irān dar Se Qarn-e Goz̲ashteh - ايران در سه قرن گذشته), Volumes 1 and 2 (Paktāb Publishing - انتشارات پاکتاب, Tehran, Iran, 2003). ISBN 964-93406-6-1 (Vol. 1), ISBN 964-93406-5-3 (Vol. 2).
- Report 2001, Islamic Republic of Iran, Amnesty International
- Latifiyan, Ali. Reviewing the performance of intellectuals from 1941 to 1979. Imam Sadiq University, CO 1995
