= Niktalab =

Niktalab is an Iranian surname. Notable people with the name include:

- Ahmad NikTalab (1934–2020), Iranian poet, author, and linguist
- Babak NikTalab (born 1967), Iranian poet and writer
- Poopak NikTalab (born 1970), Iranian author and literary researcher
- Ramak NikTalab (born 1969), Iranian Translator and writer
