= 1866 in Iran =

- Decades
- See also: Other events of 1866; Years in Iran

The following lists events that happened during 1866 in Qajar era.

== Incumbents ==
- Monarch: Naser al-Din Shah Qajar

== Births ==
- April 29 – Ali Tabatabaei, Iranian scholar and mystic.
- September 11 – Mohsen Sadr, Persian politician.
- ? – Mirza Yusif khan Mammadbeyov, Azerbaijani engineer, statesman.

== Deaths ==
- ? – Anoushirvan Khan Eyn ol-Molk, Iranian courtier.
