= Aminollah Rezaei =

Iranian painter, designer and poet (1936–2004)

- امین‌الله رضایی
- Born: 22 March 1936; Hamedan, Iran
- Died: 3 September 2004 (aged 68); Tehran, Iran
- Burial place: Behesht-e Zahra
- Occupations: Poet, painter
- Children: 2
- Relatives: Babak NikTalab (nephew); Ramak NikTalab (niece); Poopak NikTalab (niece)

Aminollah Rezaei (Persian: امین‌الله رضایی; March 22, 1936 – September 3, 2004) was an Iranian painter, designer and poet. Rezai's paintings range from surreal and symbolic works to black and thoughtful humorous cartoons. Political themes, the precise and elaborate anatomical form, the combination of human and animal limbs, and the deformation of the body are all seen in his paintings.

== Life ==
He was born on Sunday, March 22, 1936, in Hamedan. Due to his father's job and changes in his place of residence, he was born in Kuhin, on the slopes of Alvand Mountain.

From an early age, he became interested in painting, literature, poetry, music, and calligraphy, and despite his father's religious strictures, he diligently continued painting and music. However, his grandmother was not unaffected by his tendency to paint. His father, Ainollah Khan, was one of Reza Shah's comrades on the Western Front and one of Abdol-Hossein Farman Farma's war assistants during the Qajar era, as well as the head of telephone distribution at the Ministry of Post and telegraphs. Her mother was Alam Taj Rezaei, who was considered a well-known woman in Hamedan and Zanjan because of her father and husband status. His brothers, Ali and Farajullah, also turned to painting after Amin. Also in the field of music, in his youth he played the violin and his elder sister Farkhondeh (wife of Ahmad Niktalab) played the santur.

Rezaei performed a musical prelude and played the flute at the BuAli Theater in Hamedan with his friend, Yousef Amzajerdi. In 1336, he went to Tehran and there began working with Mohammad Bahrami and the Pars Art Organization. In Pars Art Organization, he gained experience working with artists such as Mohammad Ali Zavieh, Mohammad Tajvidi, Buick Ahmari, Ali Akbar Sadeghi, Morteza Momayez and became familiar with various styles and techniques of painting, graphics, clichés, engraving, printing, film and zinc separation. Rezaei also played the violin and had a good voice.

In Tehran, he met a woman named Atieh, who was from a high level family, and later married her. The marriage produced two children named Human and Farhang.

He won a six-year French scholarship and 50,000 tomans (About $71,000 in those days) in cash from the Pahlavi government at the first Tehran International Fair before the Iranian revolution, but did not accept it. He also won an honorary diploma in handicrafts from handicraft workshops in Bangalore, India from the Asian Cultural Exchange.

In the field of graphics and caricature, he collaborated with institutions such as Sepehr, Amirkabir, Padideh, Atai, Ishraqi, Iqbal, and Zan-e Rooz, etc. His cartoons were published on the art page of the Kayhan newspaper on Thursday nights.

He was a member of the Writers' Association of Iran and attended many of its meetings and statements.

Many of his writings and paintings have been published in the internal publications of the association before the revolution.

Also, some of his songs have been broadcast on national television and radio. His tomb is located in section 88 (artists' section) of Behesht-e Zahra.

== Artworks ==
Works on the topics of migration and dialogue of civilizations were exhibited in the Contemporary Museum of Tehran in the fifth biennial of the International Cartoon of Tehran (October 15 to November 15, 2001). The work "Dialogue of Civilizations" was selected as the selected work by the Cultural and Artistic Organization of Tehran Municipality in the biennial side awards section and a special statue was awarded to him.

A collection of his poems in various formats, including ghazals, which also include native poems in the Hamedani dialect, entitled "Bar Samand Khayal", 2003, "Ma" Publications.

His book Bar Samand Khayal is housed at Harvard University in the field of literary research at the Widener Library. His name is on the list of Asian cultural exchanges.

=== Paintings ===
Rezaei's paintings range from surreal and symbolic works to black and thoughtful humorous cartoons. Political themes, the precise and elaborate anatomical form, the combination of human and animal limbs, and the deformation of the body are all seen in his paintings.

Aminullah Rezaei was also active in the field of painting criticism and designed and performed interviews with Khosrow Golsorkhi with prominent artists of the time. Rezaei's paintings have been exhibited in a total of twenty-seven private and group exhibitions.
