= Mohammad Reza Heydari =

Iranian diplomat (born 1966)

Mohammad Reza Heydari محمد رضا حیدری

Expert at the Bureau of the Main Consular Office of the Ministry of Foreign Affairs
- In office 1990 – 20 August 1992

Consul of Iran to Georgia
- In office 20 August 1992 – 6 August 1996

Senior Expert at the National Organization for Civil Registration
- In office 6 August 1996 – 20 August 2000

Consul of Iran to Germany (Frankfurt)
- In office 20 August 2000 – 20 October 2003

Senior Expert at the Passport and Visa Office bureaus of Tehran’s international airports
- In office 20 October 2003 – 21 October 2007

Consul general of Iran to Norway
- In office 21 October 2007 – 5 January 2010

Personal details
- Born: 12 October 1966 (age 59) Rey, Iran

Mohammad Reza Heydari (Persian: محمد رضا حیدری; born 12 October 1966) is a former Iranian consul in Oslo who resigned his post in January 2010 in acting against his own country's Government. He resigned due to the Iranian government's violent crackdown on protesters in the 2009–2010 Iranian election protests. Mohammed-Reza Heydari is also the first Iranian diplomat to resign in protest against the regime's violence against the people.

== Life ==
=== Career and education ===
He has a Masters of International Politics from the Institute for Political & International Studies, Tehran (IPIS) and served the Iranian diplomatic service for 20 years. He had a 5-year mission in Georgia, 3 years in Germany and from 2007 to January 2010 in Norway.

His previous posts included: Senior Expert at the Bureau of the Main Consular Office of the Ministry of Foreign Affairs; Iranian Consul in Georgia; Senior Expert at the National Organization for Civil Registration; Iranian Consul in Frankfurt, Germany; Senior Expert at the Passport and Visa Office bureaus of Tehran's international airports; Iranian Consul in Oslo, Norway.

=== Resignation ===
Heydari quit on 7 January 2010 saying that his act is in opposition to Iran's latest internal issues. He tried to convince other Iranian diplomats to join him in resigning their posts but remained alone as reported. Iran's Foreign Minister Manuchehr Mottaki confirmed his resignation but said that the government had not accepted it.

In January after his resignation, he said he had requested political asylum in Norway, where he and his family were living. On 17 February 2010, Norwegian immigration authorities granted Heydari and his family asylum. In his interviews with BBC, Mr. Heydari mentioned that he has been a supporter of Mir-Hossein Mousavi and Iran's Green Movement. Demonstrators in Iran refer to Mr. Heydari in their slogans as Iran's 'Green Ambassador'. Mohammed Reza Heydari told the Norwegian broadcaster NRK that his decision to step down was tied to the crackdown, during which security forces fired directly into crowds. At least eight people were killed, including the nephew of the opposition leader Mir-Hossein Mousavi. Davoud Hermidas Bavand, a scholar and former diplomat in Iran, told the Los Angeles Times: "If Heydari applies for asylum, it will mark a significant defection for Iran – especially at a time when the Iranian people and the rest of the world are watching for cracks to appear in the government following last month's violence and such a defection would be huge, then it is going to be a precedent, because it has not happened since the beginning years of the [1979] revolution, when some of the appointed postrevolutionary diplomats defected and sought asylum. This case in Norway can be the beginning of something."

=== CNN interview ===
As Iran marked the 31st anniversary of the Islamic Revolution, a high-ranking Iranian defector warned that the national unity of Iran could be threatened if the government steps up its campaign of violence against opposition groups. "If they (Iranian officials) move in the direction of violence, they will not be able to control the system and we might move in the direction in which Iran's unity then might be compromised all together," Mohammed Reza Heydari, Iran's former down graded staff in consular section of Iranian Embassy in Oslo, Norway, told CNN's Christiane Amanpour. He said that he hopes the strikes, civil disobedience, and non-violent protests in his homeland will "break the back" of the government and force it to listen to what the people say. "The cause (of) bringing the message, bringing different groups together, is starting a referendum to have free elections in Iran so all these groups can stand together and bring about a democratic government to meet the demands of all religious and ethnic minorities as well," he said.

Heydari told Amanpour that the divisions in Iran are reflected in his country's embassy in Oslo. "There's chaos ... The diplomatic corps and the intelligence corps are split at our embassies right now," he said.

=== Green Embassy Campaign ===
After his resignation, Mr. Heydari founded the 'Green Embassy Campaign'. Green Embassy Campaign is a non governmental organization (NGO). Mohammad Reza Heydari persuaded the other Iranian diplomats and the members of staff at the Ministry of Foreign Affairs in Tehran to join this campaign and instead of being representatives of a 'coup d'état government' as he calls it, become, in his opinion, the ambassadors of their right-seeking nation.

== See also ==
- List of Iranian defectors
