= Ahmad Rezaee =

Iranian businessman

Tom J. Anderson
- Born: Ahmad Rezaee Mirghaed c. 1975 or 1976; Imperial State of Iran
- Died: 12 November 2011 (aged 35); Dubai, United Arab Emirates
- Cause of death: Disputed
- Other name: Tom J. Anderson
- Citizenship: Iranian, American
- Children: 1
- Father: Mohsen Rezaee

Tom J. Anderson (born Ahmad Rezaee Mirghaed (Persian: احمد رضایی میرقائد), c. 1975/1976 – 12 November 2011) was an Iranian businessman and the eldest son of Iranian Major General Mohsen Rezaee.

He defected to the Embassy of the United States, Vienna in 1998, which led to the Central Intelligence Agency (CIA) bringing him to New York City and granting him political asylum. He then had several interviews with Voice of America, BBC and Radio Israel, voicing his opposition with the Iranian government and activities of Islamic Revolutionary Guard Corps abroad.

He returned to Iran in 2005, without being prosecuted.

== Personal life ==
He married the daughter of his father's close friend when he was 19 and studied mathematics at a teacher training college in Tehran, but the couple soon separated. He reportedly married an American citizen later. According to Kenneth R. Timmerman, he had a daughter who was 7 years old and lived in California as of 2011.

== Death ==
On 12 November 2011, his body was found on the floor of room 23 on the 18th floor of Gloria Hotel, located in Dubai Media City. Officials at Dubai Police Force declared that he was identified as a U.S. citizen named Tom Anderson, and the cause of death was "an overdose of a medicine used to fight depression and schizophrenia". His death had been described as "suspicious" and alternative reasons such as suicide, murder and assassination were suggested as the cause of death.

== See also ==
- List of Iranian defectors
- List of unsolved deaths
