= Society for the Progress of Iran =

Progressives
- Founded: 1909
- Headquarters: Southern Persia
- Newspaper: Jonub
- Ideology: Progressivism; Liberalism; Iranian nationalism Constitutionalism; Anti-imperialism
- Religion: Islam

Society of the Supporters for Progress, Society for the Progress of Iran or Society of the Seekers of Advancement of Iran (Persian: جمعیت ترقی‌خواهان ایران, romanized: Jamʿīyat-e Taraqqiḵāhān-e Irān) or simply the Progressives, also known as the Liberals (Persian: آزادی‌خواهان, romanized: Āzādīḵᵛāhān) was a political party in constitutional period Persia and was active during the 2nd term of the Majlis, 1909–1911.

Progressives championed the development of the southern provinces of Persia and consisted of MPs representing the southerners. They promoted the building of hospitals, women's education and regarded Persian as "the official and scholarly" language of Iran.

Its organ Jonub (transl. The South) was printed in Tehran and usually criticized the Bakhtiari, and held the view that the Iranian government did not understand the importance of the Persian Gulf region. The newspaper defended democracy and civil rights and explained that the "level of progress of any nation is symbolized in its degree of freedom of expression and press" and that the elections are the only means to exercise popular sovereignty and protect territorial integrity as well as national interests.

The party was small and insignificant in numbers, but held the balance of power in the 2nd Majlis, allying with the Moderate Socialists Party and Union and Progress Party against the Democrat Party.
