= Sokhan Dictionary =

Persian monolingual dictionary

Sokhan Dictionary فرهنگ سخن
- Type: Dictionary
- Supervisor of authors: Hasan Anvari
- year of publication: 2002
- Country: Iran
- Language: Persian
- publisher: Sokhan Publications (fa)

Sokhan Dictionary (Persian: فرهنگ سخن) is one of the most recent monolingual Persian-language dictionaries, compiled under the supervision of Professor Hasan Anvari. The dictionary consists of two main editions:

The Comprehensive Edition (Great Dictionary) (Persian: فرهنگ بزرگ سخن) in eight volumes plus a one-volume supplement.
The Compact Edition (Compact Dictionary) (فرهنگ فشردهٔ سخن) in two volumes.
The Comprehensive Dictionary of Sokhan, in addition to old words, encompasses nearly all words, scientific terms, and contemporary interpretations of the Persian language. It has been compiled and published by Sokhan Publications (fa). In the compilation of the Sokhan Dictionary, besides the editor-in-chief (Prof. Hassan Anvari), 46 co-authors and 21 editors collaborated in both general and specialized sections.

== Sokhan Compact Dictionary ==
The Sokhan Compact Dictionary, authored under the supervision of Prof. Hasan Anvari, is composed of two volumes. This lexicon is a condensed version of the Sokhan Comprehensive Dictionary (an eight-volume set). In the Sokhan Compact Dictionary, lexical evidences (except for a few entries) have been omitted. Additionally, rarely used words, especially those with scant evidence and words formed analogically, have been excluded from this dictionary.

The purpose of condensing the Sokhan Comprehensive Dictionary into a two-volume format is to facilitate access for individuals who do not have access to the larger edition or are seeking concise documentation of words.

== Sokhan Contemporary Dictionary ==
The Sokhan Contemporary Dictionary (فرهنگ روز سخن) is authored in a single volume. Unlike the two main dictionaries, this lexicon does not include archaic words. Instead, its compilation focuses on contemporary Persian vocabulary and expressions. The volume of scientific terms in this edition is also less compared to the two original editions (Comprehensive Dictionary and Compact Dictionary). This dictionary, too, has been published by Sokhan Publications. In its compilation, in addition to the editor-in-chief (Prof. Hasan Anvari), 46 co-authors, and 21 editors collaborated in both general and specialized sections. The Sokhan Contemporary Dictionary was published in the year 2004 (1383 in the Persian calendar).

== Sokhan Supplementary Dictionary ==
This book is a Supplement to the Sokhan Comprehensive Dictionary (Persian: ذیل فرهنگ بزرگ سخن) to the Sokhan Comprehensive Dictionary, which was published in eight volumes in the year 2002 (1381 in the Persian calendar). It comprises words that were omitted or newly discovered, as well as corrections of printing and non-printing errors and mistakes in references that occurred across the eight volumes. Additionally, it includes some new evidence for entries that had limited or no evidence previously.

== Features of Sokhan Dictionary ==
The Sokhan Dictionary comprises 75,000 main entries, 45,000 sub-entries, 16,000 documented evidences, 1,000 examples, and 1,500 images. It encompasses almost all words used in both archaic and Modern Persian language.
