= Ali Latifiyan =

Iranian writer (born 1968)

- علی لطیفیان
- Pronunciation: [ʔæˈliː lætʰiːfiːˈjɒːn]
- Born: December 6, 1968 (age 57); Tehran, Iran
- Citizenship: Iran
- Education: Political sciences, Islamic studies
- Occupation: Researcher
- Notable work: Reviewing the performance of Iranian intellectuals
- Spouse: Poopak NikTalab
- Children: Pouya, Parniya
- Relatives: Heydar Latifiyan (great-grandfather)

Ali Latifiyan (Persian: علی لطیفیان; born 6 December 1968) is an Iranian writer, researcher, political theorist, and historian. Most of his work is in enlightenment, intellectualism, liberalism and Iranian culture.

== Early life ==
Latifiyan was born on 15 December 1968, in Tehran. His father, Mohammad Hossein Latifiyan, was an employee of Tehran University. This caused him to attend the meetings of professors of the University of Tehran as a child. His father's grandfather, Heydar Latifiyan, was a commander during World War I (Middle Eastern theatre) in the Persian campaign.

He received his diploma in natural sciences from Fatemi High School (one of the Tehran's best high schools in the 1980s). Due to his interest in political science, he continued his higher studies in this field. He earned his master's degree in two subjects: political science and Islamic studies.

== Career ==
He started teaching history and sociology in Iranian universities and schools.

He published numerous papers and articles. A collection of those works is brought together in Naghashi-Koodaki. Most of his works are short pieces about Iranian history.

His book, Reviewing the Performance of Intellectuals from 1941 to 1979, investigates intellectuals such as Jalal Al-Ahmad, Abdolkarim Soroush, Ali Shariati, Sadeq Hedayat, Mirzadeh Eshghi, Ahmad Shamlou, and during the time of Mohammad Reza Pahlavi (especially during Mohammad Mosaddegh events) was praised and encouraged by Abdolreza Hoshang Mahdavi, Hoshang Moqtader and Abdul Ali Bigdeli.

One of the people who influenced him was his teacher, Davoud Hermidas-Bavand, one of the leaders of National Front of Iran.

He married Poopak NikTalab (daughter of Ahmad NikTalab) in 1999.
