= Poopak NikTalab =

Iranian author and literary researcher (born 1970)

- پوپک نیک‌طلب
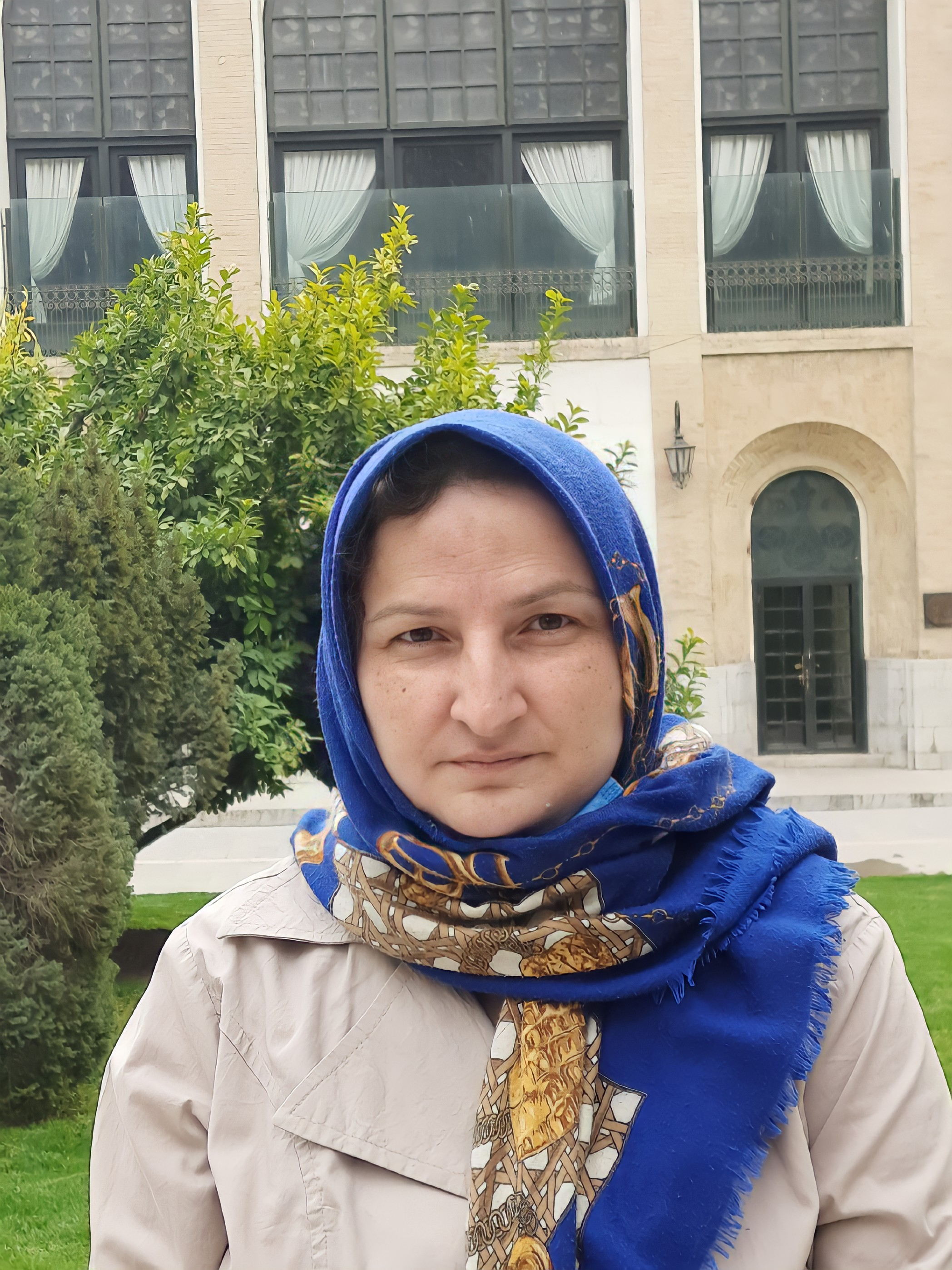
- Born: 19 May 1970 (age 56); Tehran, Iran
- Education: Bachelor of Mathematics, Alzahra University Master of Educational Technology Management, Allameh Tabataba'i University
- Occupations: Poet, researcher
- Notable work: Sarve Samarqand
- Spouse: Ali Latifiyan (m. 1999)
- Children: 2
- Parents: Ahmad NikTalab (father); Farkhondeh Mahmoodi (mother)
- Relatives: Aminollah Rezaei (uncle) Babak NikTalab (brother) Ramak NikTalab (sister)

Poopak NikTalab (Persian: پوپک نیک‌طلب, pronounced [pʰuːˈpʰæk ˌniːkˈtʰælæb]; born 19 May 1970), also Pupak Niktalab, is an Iranian education theorist, author and literary researcher in children's literature.

== Life ==
She was born in 1970 in Tehran in a cultural and literary family. She is a member of Niktalab family and one of the daughters of Ahmad Niktalab. After receiving a diploma in mathematics and physics, she was immediately accepted to Al-Zahra University in the field of mathematics. She married Ali Latifiyan (Researcher of Iranian culture and history) in 1999. The result of this marriage is two children named Parniya and Pouya.

Many of her works have been published in magazines around the world. For example, Ettela'at newspaper, Zan-e-rooz magazine, Moon magazines and Children and Adolescents Book Review Quarterly.

She has collaborated with various institutions and organizations, including the Iranian Association of Children and Adolescent Writers (Navisak), Roshd Magazines, the Ministry of Education of Iran, etc. She is one of the theorists of education in the world. She has also interacted with World Bank experts in the field of education for a long time in the Ministry of Education of Iran.

Her writings are also used in the fields of Tajikistan studies and Afghanistan studies, and in research on the biographies of children's literature writers from India, Russia, Palestine, Syria, Lebanon, Egypt, Uzbekistan, Georgia, Kyrgyzstan, Kazakhstan, Turkey, Morocco, Turkmenistan, Pakistan, Azerbaijan, Qatar, UAE, Cyprus, Iraq, Kuwait, Bahrain, Oman, Yemen, Saudi Arabia and Jordan. Some of her articles on children's literature in more than 50 countries have been published in a book called From the Alleys of Samarkand to the Mediterranean Coast.

The book of Sarv Samarkand, in addition to the expression of Rudaki's poetry, is a complete description of Rudaki's poetry.

She is also a specialist in world children's literature. There are many of her articles in this field. According to the ISNA news agency, She was invited to speak at international conferences on world children's literature.

Her speeches on Persian literature are broadcast on Internet networks such as the Tajik Radio Rudaki (in Tajik: Рудаки Радио) and the Shabnamestan Internet channel.

On the 200th birthday of Hans Christian Andersen, she was awarded the Outstanding Research Prize for Children's Literature.

== Partial bibliography ==
- Samarkand cedar (Rudaki Continuous Poems Description) Print 2020, Faradid Publishing
- Translation of the book "From Fire to Reactor", published in April 1973, Tarbiat Publications.
- Translation of the fiction book "City on the Moon", first edition in 1995, Mahya Publications and second edition in 1997
- Rewriting the book of poems "Aghabilg and the wish of generations", published in 1975, Hozeh Honari Publications.
- From the Alleyways of Samarkand to the Mediterranean Coast (The Evolution of the World of Child and Adolescent Literature(in 33 countries) Print 2019, Faradid Publishing
- Poetry in the Mirror of the Child (Teaching poems for children), print 2003, Bashir Science and Literature
- Father of the Sunshine of Kindness, Printed 1999, Paknevis Publishing
