= Mohammad-Reza Bateni =

Iranian linguist and scholar (1934–2021)

Mohammad Reza Bateni
- محمدرضا باطنی
- Born: 4 January 1934; Isfahan, Iran
- Died: 11 May 2021 (aged 87); Tehran, Iran
- Occupation: Linguist
- Spouse: Shahin Nafarabadi
- Children: 2

Mohammad Reza Bateni (Persian: محمدرضا باطنی; January 4, 1934 – May 11, 2021) was an Iranian linguist and scholar. He graduated as bachelor in English language and literature from Daneshsara-ye Aali (Institute of Higher Education) in Tehran. He obtained his Master and Doctoral degrees, in linguistics, from University of Leeds and University College London, respectively. Bateni also worked at MIT and University of California, Berkeley, as a researcher and professor. He retired from Tehran University in 1981.

Bateni published numerous books and journal papers. Some of his works include "A New Glance at Grammar", "A Description of Persian Language Structure" and "A Prologue to Philosophy". "A Description of Persian Language Structure" (republished 20 times) is an analytical study of the structure of 11,000 Persian sentences culled from magazines, newspapers and different writings.

Perhaps Bateni's most significant contribution is his English to Persian Dictionary published by Farhang Moaser. The first edition of the dictionary received the Book of the Year Award in 1994. It included about 40,000 entries of contemporary English words. The second edition of this dictionary included approximately 50,000 entries. The third edition, entitled Farhang Moaser POOYA English-Persian Dictionary embraces about 60,000 entries in addition to numerous subentries and examples. This edition, published in 2006, is the result of over 20 years of research by Dr. Bateni and his associates at the Research Unit of Farhang Moaser Institute.

== Selected publications ==
- "Assessing the State of Contemporary Persian", a Plenary Lecture at Seventh Biennial Conference on Iranian Studies, July 31- August 3, 2008, Toronto .
- "Collocations and Idioms and their Translatability" at Seventh Biennial Conference on Iranian Studies, July 31- August 3, 2008, Toronto .
- "Recent Advances in Persian Lexicography" at the First International Conference on Aspects of Iranian Linguistics, 17–19 June 2005 Leipzig, Germany .
- "A Glance at Sociology of Language ( Sociolinguistics )", July 2007, University of Toronto.
- "Language Relativity", August 2008, University of Toronto.
- "On the Attempts to Teach Language to Chimpanzees: Success or Failure?", November 2009, University of Toronto.
