= List of Iranian defectors =

This is a list of individuals who have defected from Iran.

Name	Occupation	Year	Notes	Ref.
Alireza Sohbati	Diplomat	2026	Diplomat at the Iranian embassy in Copenhagen, applied for asylum in Denmark.	
Mohammad Pournajaf	Diplomat	2026	Chargé d'affaires of the Islamic Republic’s embassy in Canberra, applied for asylum in Australia.	
Atefeh Ramezanizadeh	Athlete	2026	Player for the Iran women's national football team; defected during the 2026 AFC Women's Asian Cup in Australia and was subsequently granted a humanitarian visa by the Australian government	
Zahra Ghanbari	Athlete	2026	Player for the Iran women's national football team; defected during the 2026 AFC Women's Asian Cup in Australia and was subsequently granted a humanitarian visa by the Australian government	
Fatemeh Pasandideh	Athlete	2026	Player for the Iran women's national football team; defected during the 2026 AFC Women's Asian Cup in Australia and was subsequently granted a humanitarian visa by the Australian government	
Gholam-Reza Derikvand	Diplomat	2026	Chargé d'affaires of the Iranian embassy in Vienna; requested asylum from Switzerland due to the political unrest during the 2025-2026 Iranian protests	
Alireza Jeyrani Hokmabad	Diplomat	2026	Senior official at Iran’s permanent mission to UN; requested asylum from Switzerland due to the political unrest during the 2025-2026 Iranian protests	
Kimia Alizadeh	Athlete	2020	First woman from Iran to win an Olympic medal (Taekwondo)	
Saeid Mollaei	Athlete	2019	Olympic judoka and 2018 world champion	
Pourya Jalalipour	Athlete	2019	Para-archer who qualified for the 2020 Olympic Games in Tokyo, Japan	
Farzad Farhangian	Diplomat	2010	Former press attache at the Iranian embassy in Brussels, Belgium	
Mohammad Reza Heydari	Diplomat	2010		
Hossein Alizadeh	Diplomat	2010		
Shahram Amiri	Nuclear scientist	2009	Returned to Iran in 2010; executed by the Iranian government in 2016 “for revealing top secrets to the enemy”	
Ahmad Rezaee		1998	Eldest son of Iranian conservative politician and senior military officer Mohsen Rezaee; found dead in 2011 at a hotel in Dubai, United Arab Emirates (possible assassination)	
Abdolghassem Mesbahi	Intelligence operative	1996		
Marzieh	Singer	1994		
Mehdi Rezvani	Athlete	1986	Weightlifter competing at the 1986 Asian Games in Seoul, South Korea; won the bronze medal at the 242-pound class	
Samad Montazeri	Athlete	1986	Weightlifter competing at the 1986 Asian Games in Seoul, South Korea	
Siamak Bajand	Athlete	1986	Weightlifter competing at the 1986 Asian Games in Seoul, South Korea	
Ardhir Bahmanyar	Athlete	1986	Weightlifter competing at the 1986 Asian Games in Seoul, South Korea	
Ali Akbar Mohammadi	Pilot	1986	Former pilot for the speaker of the Iranian parliament, Akbar Rafsanjani; assassinated in Hamburg, West Germany, in 1987	
Iraj Fazeli	Pilot	1983	Due to his opposition to the Iranian regime, he first flew to Van in Turkey in a Northrop F-5 (the plane returned a week later). He later went to the U.S. before disappearing there in 1989.	
Parviz Khazai	Diplomat	1982	Chargé d'affaires at the Iranian embassy in Oslo, Norway	
Reza Abedi	Athlete	1982	Wrestler	
Ardeshir Asgari	Athlete	1982	Wrestler	
Keyhan Jahanfakhr	Pilot	1982	Iranian airline pilot; applied for political asylum in Austria after piloting his Iran Air Boeing 727 on a flight from Tehran	
Seyyed Jabbar Mehdiyoun	Athlete	1982	Wrestler; defected during the 1982 World Wrestling Championships in Edmonton, Canada	
Mohammad Hossein Naghdi	Diplomat	1982	Charge d'affaires at the Iranian embassy in Rome, Italy; assassinated in Rome in 1993	
Javad Hussain	Military	1981	Iranian Air Force colonel	
