= Hasan Anvari =

Iranian professor of Persian literature and lexicographer

Hasan Anvari حسن انوری
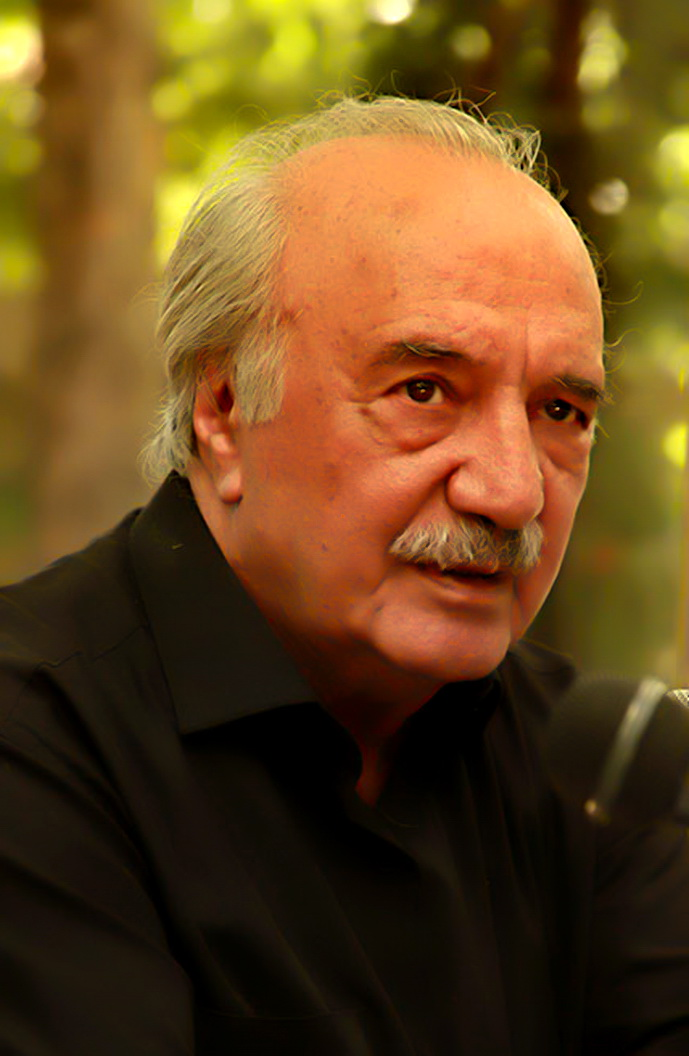
- Born: March 1, 1934 (age 92); Takab, West Azerbaijan province, Iran
- Education: University of Tabriz (BA); University of Tehran (MA, PhD)
- Occupations: Professor of Persian literature, lexicographer
- Known for: Continuous member of the Academy of Persian Language and Literature
- Parent(s): Ali-Asghar Anvari(father); Tahereh Hasanzadeh (mother)

Hasan Anvari or Hassan Anvari (Persian: حسن انوری; born March 1, 1934, in Takab) is a retired professor of Persian language and literature at Kharazmi University. He served as the supervisor for the compilation of the comprehensive and then compiled editions Sokhan Dictionary (in 8 and 2 volumes respectively), the editor of Saadi's Golestan, and a continuous member of the Academy of Persian Language and Literature. He is recognized as a prominent figure in the field of Persian literature. Additionally, a portion of his research is dedicated to the study of Hafez's poetry. Anvari has also contributed to the compilation of some volumes of Dehkhoda Dictionary. He is of Azerbaijani descent, born in Takab, West Azerbaijan province. In 2016, the Elite Foundation of Tehran Province held a ceremony to honor him, attended by a gathering of prominent academic and cultural figures of the country, his students, and outstanding talents. Anvari is also a member of the book selection committee and the Mahmoud Afshar Foundation Prize.

== Education ==
- BA in Persian literature from the University of Tabriz, 1961
- MA in Persian literature from the University of Tehran, 1967
- PhD in Persian literature from the University of Tehran, 1971
