= Ramak NikTalab =

Iranian writer and translator (born 1969)

- رامک نیک‌طلب
- Pronunciation: [ɹɒːˈmæk ˌniːkˈtʰælæb]
- Born: 1969 (age 56–57); Tehran, Iran
- Education: Bachelor of English Literature, Tehran University Master of Public Administrations
- Occupations: writer, translator
- Parents: Ahmad NikTalab (father); Farkhondeh Mahmoodi (mother)
- Relatives: Aminollah Rezaei (uncle) Babak NikTalab (brother) Poopak NikTalab (sister)

Ramak NikTalab (Persian: رامک نیک‌طلب, pronounced [ɹɒːˈmæk ˌniːkˈtʰælæb]; born 1969) is an Iranian translator and author of Persian literature. Her specialty is in children's literature. She is a member of a NikTalab family. Some of her books are between the "A Thousand Years of the Persian Book" Series in the Library of Congress.

== Biography ==
Ramak NikTalab was born in 1969 in The NikTalab family in Tehran. Her father is Ahmad NikTalab (Was an Iranian poet) and her mother is Farkhondeh Mahmoodi (is an artist from Iran). Babak and Poopak are her siblings.

Ramak graduated from Tehran University with a degree in English literature and then studied Public administration. Ramak started writing and translating since she was a teenager. She is one of the first members of the Iranian Children and Adolescent Writers Association (Nevisak). She is the first person who translated the novels of Peter Pan and Sara Crewe into Persian language. She is the author of the stories of two Iranian national characters named Dara and Sara. From these fictional characters, dolls with the same name were made, wearing different clothes of Iranian tribes.

She seriously and professionally entered the field of translation and writing for children and teenagers since 1990, and her first book was the 6-volume collection "Sam Firefighter".

== The Voyages of Dara and Sara in Iran ==
Some of her books (It called: The Voyages of Dara and Sara in Iran) are between the "A Thousand Years of the Persian Book" Series in the Library of Congress.

== Selected works ==
=== Compilations ===
- Tales for the first grade (In Persian: قصه هایی برای کلاس اولی), Zaytoun Publishing
- Teacher, gardener of kindness: a collection of poems for teenagers (In Persian:معلم، باغبان مهربانی: مجموعه شعر برای نوجوانان); with Babak NikTalab, Paknevis Publications
- Mother, an angel of kindness: a collection of poems for teenagers (In Persian:مادر، فرشته مهربانی: مجموعه شعر برای نوجوانان); with Babak NikTalab, Paknevis Publications
- The author's status in Russia (In Persian: وضعیت نویسنده در روسیه), Journal of fiction literature

==== The collection of Dara and Sarah's travels ====
- Dara & Sara in Kerman (In Persian: دارا و سارا در کرمان), Institute for the Intellectual Development of Children and Young Adults
- Dara & Sara in Hamedan (In Persian: دارا و سارا در همدان), Institute for the Intellectual Development of Children and Young Adults
- Dara & Sara in Fars (In Persian: دارا و سارا در فارس), Institute for the Intellectual Development of Children and Young Adults
- Dara & Sara in Khorasan (In Persian: دارا و سارا در خراسان), Institute for the Intellectual Development of Children and Young Adults

=== Translations ===
- Sara Crewe, Qadiani Publications Institute; ISBN 9789644175909
- Little princess (Pocket classics), Qadiani Publications Institute; ISBN 9786002511003
- Sara Crewe (classic novel); Qadiani Publications Institute; ISBN 9780000677204
- Peter Pan, Qadiani Publications Institute, ISBN 9789645365231
- I am angry, Qadiani Publications Institute, Banafsheh Books
- The story of my journey to Alpha, Mihrab Qalam publishing, ISBN 9786001038693
- Sam's colored balloons, Noor al-Saghalin Publications, Fakher
- Ponti Pandi's White Christmas, Noor al-Saghalin Publishing House, Fakher
- Cat theft, Noor al-Saghalin publishing house; Fakher
- Troubled Tour, Noor Al-Saghalin Publications; Fakher
- The big race; Noor al-Saghlain Publications, Fakher
- Real auction; Noor al-Saghlain Publications, Fakher
