= Parviz Varjavand =

Iranian archaeologist (1934–2007)

Parviz Varjavand پرویز ورجاوند
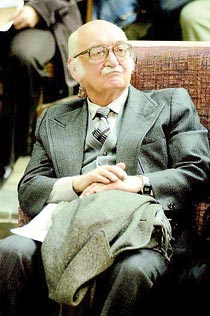

Minister of Arts and Culture Acting
- In office 25 February 1979 – 8 March 1979
- Prime Minister: Mehdi Bazargan
- Preceded by: Mohsen Foroughi (Shah era)
- Succeeded by: Ministry abolished

Personal details
- Born: 5 January 1934 Tehran, Iran
- Died: 10 June 2007 (aged 73) Tehran, Iran
- Party: National Front
- Education: Sorbonne University; University of Tehran

Parviz Varjavand (Persian: پرویز ورجاوند, alao Romanized as "Parviz Varjāvand"; 5 January 1934 – 10 June 2007) was a notable Iranian archaeologist, researcher, university professor and politician who was a prominent member of Iran National Front.

== Early life and political career ==
He was born on 5 January 1934 in Tehran. Professor Varjavand graduated with an MA from the University of Tehran and also obtained a PhD in the Renovation of Monuments and Classical Architecture of Iran from the University of Sorbonne in France.

He was caretaker of Ministry of Arts and Culture in Interim Government of Mehdi Bazargan.

He was a member of the leadership council and spokesperson of National Front of Iran.

Varjavand was active in cultural heritage affairs and he made efforts to register Persepolis, the Choghazanbil Ziggurat and Naqsh-e Jahan complex on the UNESCO World Heritage List.

== Death ==
He died on 10 June 2007, in Milad Hospital at the age of 73.

Party political offices
| Preceded by Hassan Lebaschi | Spokesperson of the National Front; 1999–2007 | Succeeded by Davoud Hermidas-Bavand |
