= Homa Nategh =

Iranian historian

- Born: 26 May 1934; Urmia, Iran
- Died: 1 January 2016 (aged 81); Arrou, France
- Spouse: Nasser Pakdaman
- Children: 2
- Parents: Naseh Nategh (father); Nosrat Rafei (mother)

Academic background
- Education: Sorbonne
- Thesis: Seyyed Djamal-ed-Din Assad Abadi dit Afghani: Ses sejour, son action et son influence en Perse (1967)
- Doctoral advisor: Marcel Colombe

Academic work
- Discipline: History
- Institutions: University of Tehran; Sorbonne Nouvelle

Homa Nategh (Persian: هما ناطق; May 26, 1934 – January 1, 2016) was an Iranian historian, Professor of History at University of Tehran. A specialist in the contemporary history of Iran, she resided in Paris, France, until her death. She was active during Iran's 1979 revolution. After the revolution she was purged from the University of Tehran and moved to Paris, where she was appointed as professor of the Iranian Studies at the Sorbonne. In Sorbonne she published several articles on Iranian history in Qajar period.

== Political activities ==
Nategh began her political activities when she was a student in Paris, having been described as "sympathetic to feminist causes and to the Ieft wing of the National Front". Ironically enough, however, during the 1979 revolution in Iran she joined voices with fundamentalist Islamists and called for all women to wear Islamic hijab. She was a member of the Confederation of Iranian Students, and one of the first females join it. After the Iranian Revolution, she was associated with the Organization of Iranian People's Fedai Guerrillas and after the split, she sided with the minority faction.
