= Mirza Yusif khan Mammadbeyov =

Mirza Yusif kahn Javanshir Mammadbeyov
- Born: 1866; Tabriz, Qajar Iran
- Died: 1934 (aged 67–68); Tabriz, Pahlavi Iran
- Occupations: Statesman and engineer

Mirza Yusif kahn Javanshir Mammadbeyov (Azerbaijani:Məmmədbəyov Mirzə Yusif xan Məhəmmədəli xan oğlu; 1866, Tabriz, Qajar Iran - 1934, Tabriz, Pahlavi Iran) was an Azerbaijani statesman, engineer and deputy minister of Azerbaijan Democratic Republic.

== Life ==
Mirza Yusif Khan was born in 1866 in the city of Tabriz. Due to receiving a good education for the time, he acquired the title of Mirza. In 1899, he graduated from the Tiflis Gymnasium, initially entered the mathematics faculty of St. Petersburg University, but eventually graduated from the St. Petersburg Institute of Railways. After completing his education, he worked in the South Caucasus Roads Administration and became the head of the Aghstafa and Baku regions.

In 1918, with the establishment of the Azerbaijan Democratic Republic (ADR), he served in the state institutions. From March 1919, he became the deputy minister of Roads, Post, and Telegraph of the ADR. In 1920, when Azerbaijan was occupied by Bolsheviks, he migrated to Iran. He died there in 1934.

== Family ==
Yusif Khan was a descendant of Ibrahimkhalil Khan, the Khan of Karabakh. His great-grandfather, Abulfat Khan Tuti, was the son of Ibrahimkhalil Khan. Yusif Khan's grandfather, Mohammadali Khan, served as a Lieutenant General in the Qajar army and later migrated to the South Caucasus, where he settled. Yusif Khan himself established a family by marrying Mina Khanum, the daughter of Ibrahim Bey Davatdarov. They had two sons named Rashid Bey and Murad Bey.

== See also ==
- Abu'l-Fath Khan Javanshir

== Works cited ==
- Çingizoğlu, Ənvər (2007). Əbülfət xan Qarabağlınım törəməsi. Baku: Adiloğlu.
