= Union and Progress Party (Persia) =

- Leader: Zayn-al-ʿĀbedīn Mostaʿān-al-Molk
- Founded: 1908
- Newspaper: Esteghlal-e Iran
- Ideology: Socialism

Union and Progress Party or Unity and Progress Party (Persian: حزب اتفاق و ترقی, romanized: Ḥezb-e Ettefāq wa taraqqī) was a political party in constitutional period of Qajar Persia.

In the 1909 Persian legislative election, they won 4 seats and allied with the Moderate Socialists Party against Democrat Party.

The party's line had little resemblance to that of similarly named the party active in the Ottoman Empire and contained some socialist demands. Most of the party's supporters were active in the countrysides.
