= Babak NikTalab =

Iranian poet (born 1967)

- بابک نیک‌طلب
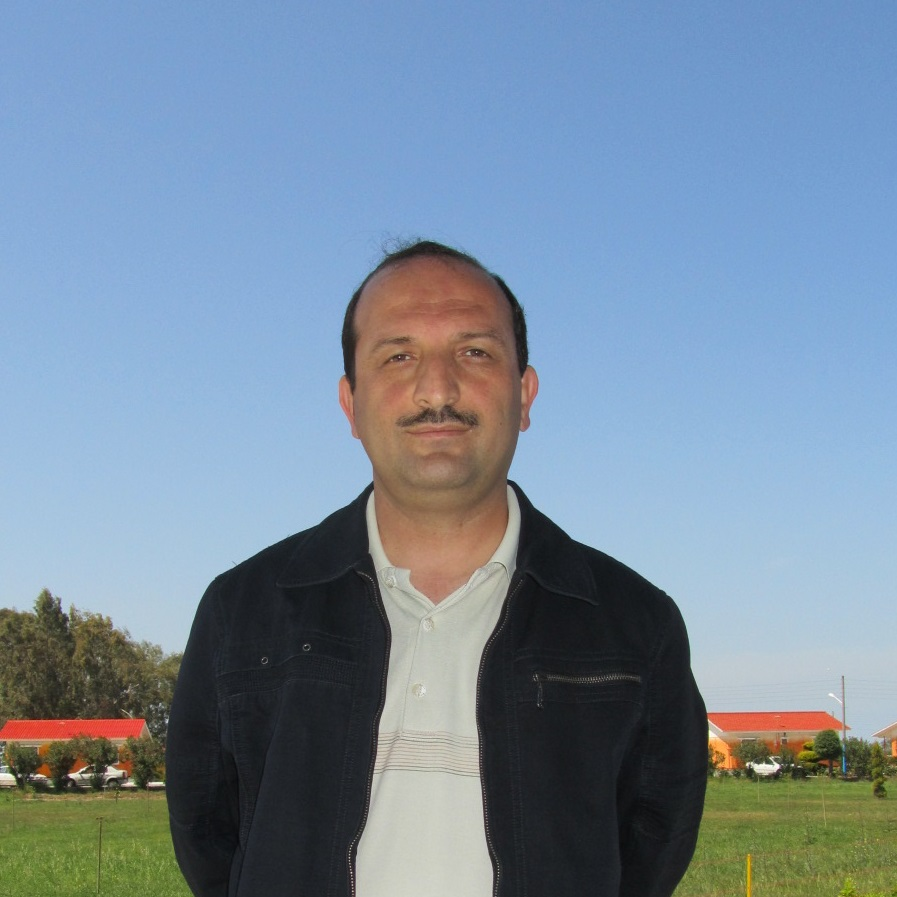
- Pronunciation: [bɒːˈbæk ˌniːkˈtʰælæb]
- Born: 30 June 1967 (age 59); Tehran, Iran
- Education: Bachelor of Persian literature
- Occupation: Poet
- Known for: Juvenile literature
- Parents: Ahmad NikTalab (father); Farkhondeh Mahmoodi (mother)
- Relatives: Aminollah Rezaei (uncle) Poopak NikTalab (sister) Ramak NikTalab (sister)

Babak NikTalab (Persian: بابک نیک‌طلب [bɒːˈbæk ˌniːkˈtʰælæb]; born 30 June 1967) is an Iranian poet and writer known for his work in juvenile literature. He won the Golden Cypress for the 5th edition of the Fajr International Poetry Festival and was one of the winners of the first Abbas Yamini Sharif Award. In some Arabic publications, he has been mentioned as the father of Iranian adolescent poetry. He is also mentioned as one of the most influential cultural figures in the contemporary Middle East in Indiana University's Visual Culture Research in the Modern Middle East.

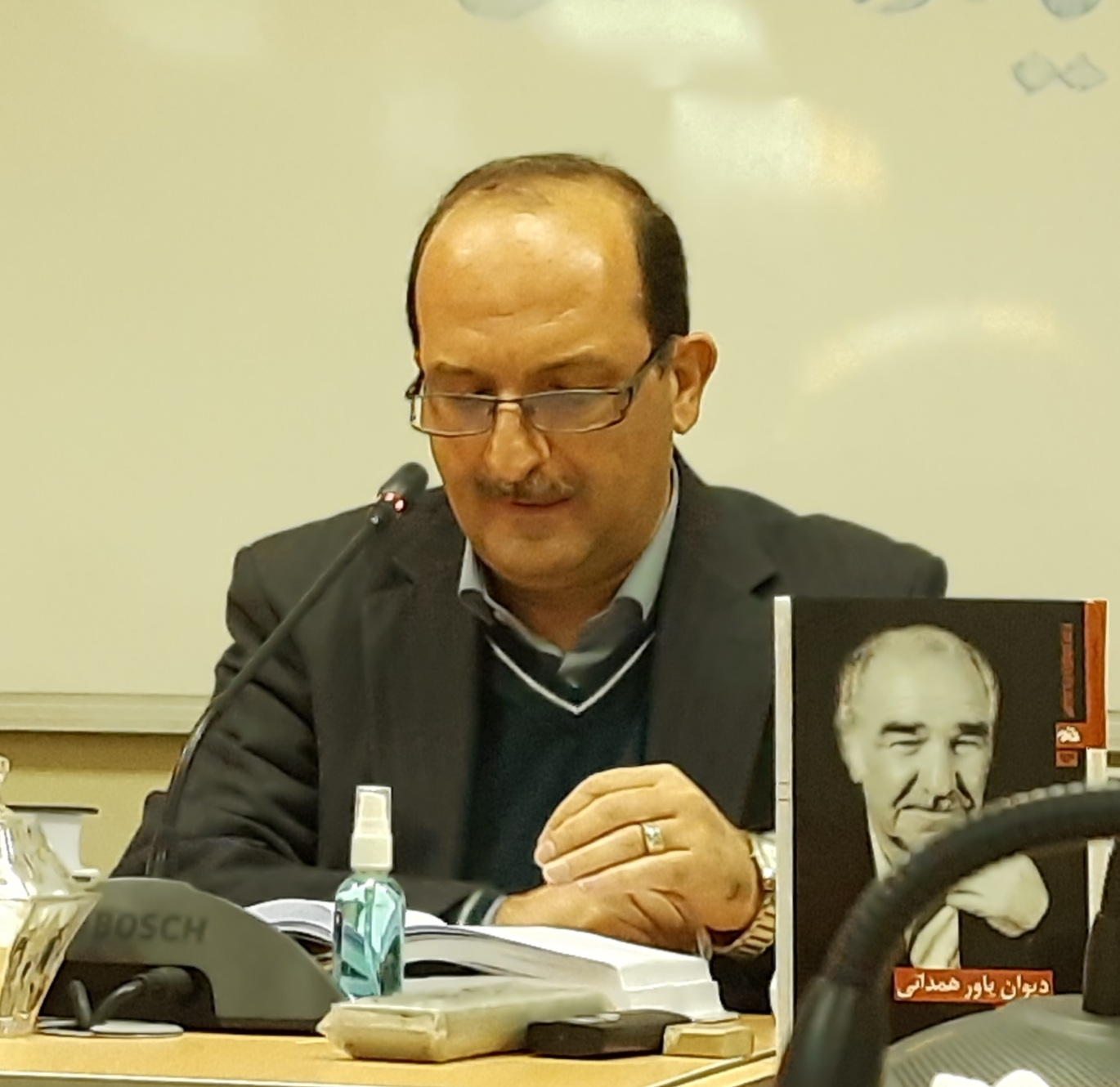
Babak Niktalab at the unveiling ceremony of the Divan of Ahmad NikTalab

== Life ==
Babak NikTalab was born in Tehran on 30 July 1967. He started composing poetry at the age of 16. He is the son of Ahmad NikTalab, an Iranian poet. Niktalab was his first independent book, Pishvaz Roshani, which he published in 1992.

He has collaborated with the Children and Adolescents Intellectual Development Center, Poetry Council of Tehran Municipality Cultural and Artistic Organization, Poetry Council of the Music Office of the Ministry of Culture and Guidance, Association of Children and Adolescent Writers (Navisak). He has also supervised the poetry section of various magazines such as Student Roshd Magazine. Some of his books have been published as audio books. He is a literary expert at the Ministry of Education of Iran.

=== Influencing Middle Eastern culture ===
In Visual Culture in the Modern Middle East, the book's authors Christiane Gruber and Sune Haugbolle, according to the preface and page 82 of this book refer to the book Aftab Afarinesh (in English: Sun of Creations) (published by the Children and Adolescents Intellectual Development Center), Babak NikTalab has been mentioned as one of the cultural influences of the contemporary Middle East.

== Awards ==
- The first person in the poetry section of children and adolescents for the fifth edition of the Fajr International Poetry Festival in 2010.
- Winner of Sarv Zarrin (Golden Cypress) Fifth edition of Fajr International Poetry Festival in 2010.
- Poetry collection Hich Hich Hichaneh, winner of the first award of Abbas Yamineh Sharif in 2012.
- Winner of the book Soroush Nojavan in 1973
- Golden Tablet for the 4th Book Festival of the Year of the Center for the Intellectual Development of Children and Adolescents
- Pishvaz Roshani won the Golden Plate for the 4th Book Festival of the Year of the Center for the Intellectual Development of Children and Adolescents and has won the book of the Year of Soroush Adolescent in 1994.

== Selected works ==
- Golbang Tarbiat Collections, General Directorate of Culture and Arts of the Ministry of Education
- Panjare Aseman (Windows of the Sky), 1999, Ofogh Publishing
- Journal of Adolescent Poetry
- ََAsiyab Bacharkh, Bacharkh, 2004, Surah Mehr Publications
- Pishvaz Roshani, Javaneh Publishing, 1992
- Long live Iran, 2010, Surah Mehr Publications
- Sleep and Imagination Songs (from the collection of home songs), 2008,Institute for the Intellectual Development of Children and Young Adults (CIDCA).
- Ta Khiyaban Khoshbakhti (Up to Happiness Street), 2010, Institute for the Intellectual Development of Children and Young Adults
- From the Sky to Here (from the collection of home songs), 2006, Institute for the Intellectual Development of Children and Young Adults .
- Aftab Afarinesh (from the collection of worried butterflies), 2006, Institute for the Intellectual Development of Children and Young Adults .
- Salam Golmohammadi (from the collection of worried butterflies), 2006, Institute for the Intellectual Development of Children and Young Adults.
- Poetry of Prayer (from the collection of home songs) 2006, Institute for the Intellectual Development of Children and Young Adults.
- Games, games, games (from the collection of home songs), 2006, Institute for the Intellectual Development of Children and Young Adults.
- We are waiting for you, 2005, Institute for the Intellectual Development of Children and Young Adults.
- Ladder of the Star, 2002, Institute for the Intellectual Development of Children and Young Adults.
- Hafez Today, Excerpts from Hafez's poems, Ofogh Publishing, 2003
- Saadi Today, Excerpts from Saadi Park Poems, Ofogh Publishing, 2003
- Rumi Today, Selection of Shams Ghazaliyat Poems, Ofogh Publishing, 2003
- Nezami Today, excerpts from the poems of Lily and Majnoon, published by Ofogh, 2003
- Ferdowsi Today, Selection of Rostam and Sohrab Epic Poems, Ofogh Publishing, 2003
- Excerpts from Vahshi Bafghi poems, 2003, Ofogh Publishing
