= Davoud Hermidas-Bavand =

Iranian diplomat and political scientist (1934–2023)

Davoud Hermidas Bavand
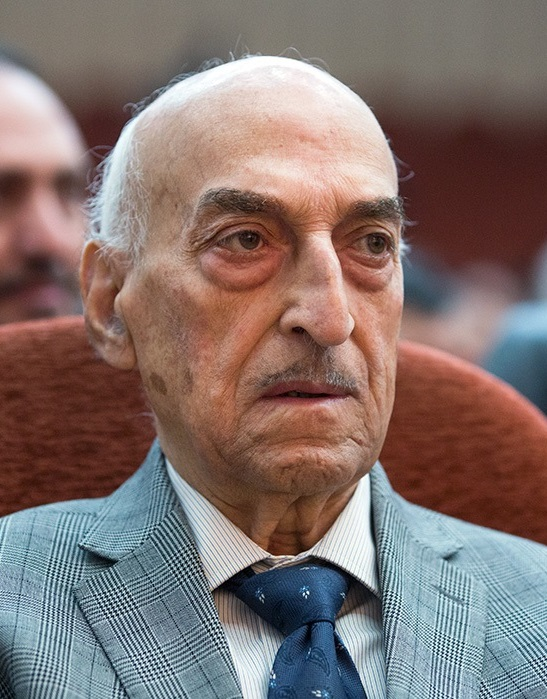
- Born: 10 November 1934; Tehran, Persia
- Died: 12 November 2023 (aged 89)
- Education: American University; University of Tehran
- Political party: National Front

Davoud Hermidas-Bavand (Persian: داوود هرمیداس باوند; 10 November 1934 – 12 November 2023) was an Iranian diplomat and political scientist. He was a member of National Front of Iran's leadership council and served as its spokesperson.

Hermidas-Bavand served in Iran's delegation to the United Nations. He was Vice-Chairman of the ad hoc committee on the drafting of International Convention against the Taking of Hostages in 1979.

== Early life and education ==
Davoud Hermidas-Bavand was born in Tehran on 10 November 1934. He obtained with honours a bachelor's degree in law and political sciences from Tehran University in 1957. He left Iran in 1958 and he was conferred a doctorate in international relations by American University, Washington, D.C., in 1963.

== Teaching ==
Bavand taught at Rhode Island University, Allameh Tabatabai University (International Law and International Relations), Tehran, Imam Sadegh University and Azad University.

Among his famous students during his teaching was Ali Latifiyan.

== Aseman newspaper case ==
Aseman (Sky), a reformist newspaper, was shut because of an interview with Bavand after just one week of publication. The closure was done after Davoud Hermidas-Bavand described eye-for-an-eye punishment as "inhumane." Aseman was aligned with the country's new president Hassan Rouhani. Former reformist president, Mohammad Khatami, had endorsed the paper in a letter published in its first edition, saying, "Whenever the space for life tightens; whenever the land dries up and is deprived of water," people "lift their eyes to the sky to keep hope alive."

According to the Prosecutor's office, "The newspaper was banned for spreading lies and insulting Islam."

== Death ==
Davoud Hermidas-Bavand died on 12 November 2023, at the age of 89.

== Books ==
- "Historical, Legal and Political Sovereignty Over Abu Musa, the Greater and Lesser Tunbs"
- "Landlocked and Semi-Landlocked Seas"
- "Macro Policies and Micro Islands"
- "Norouz, Violation of International Commitments and Consequent Responsibilities."

== Notes ==
Party political offices
Preceded by Parviz Varjavand	Spokesperson of the National Front; 2007–2023	Vacant
