= Ahmad NikTalab =

Iranian author and linguist (1934–2020)

- احمد نیک‌طلب
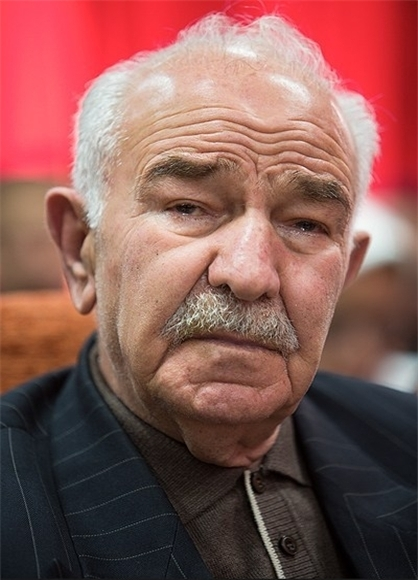
- Pronunciation: [æhˈmæd ˌniːk'tʰælæb]
- Born: 22 April 1934; Hamedan, Iran
- Died: 3 March 2020 (aged 85); Tehran, Iran
- Burial place: Behesht-e Zahra
- Other names: Yavar Hamedani
- Education: Bachelor of Journalism, Tehran University
- Occupations: Poet, author, linguist
- Notable work: Alvandieh
- Spouse: Farkhondeh Mahmoodi
- Children: Babak, Ramak, Poopak, Siyamak

Ahmad NikTalab (Persian: احمد نیک‌طلب, IPA: [æhˈmæd ˌniːk'tʰælæb]; 22 April 1934 – 3 March 2020), also known as Yavar Hamedani (یاور همدانی [jɒːˈvæɹ hæˌmedɒːˈniː]), was an Iranian poet, author, and linguist.

== Life ==
He was born in Hamedan. After education and living in Hamedan for the first part of his life, he went to Tehran to continue his education in Tehran University. His first articles were published in Armaghan Magazines. His first poems were published at the age of thirteen. He has been active in the literary associations of Hamedan and Tehran, including the Iranian Literary Association. He was also a prominent member of the Iranian Literary Association. Rahi Moayeri, Mehrdad Avesta, Hossein Monzavi, etc. were among his acquaintances and colleagues. From the 1930s, Ahmad Niktalab began his work with the Radio Organization, along with figures such as Rahi Moayeri, many of whose songs have been sung on music ever since. Many of Hamedani's local songs have been translated into many Eastern languages while being broadcast on Iranian radio programs.

He is a member of the Niktalab family. His eldest son is Babak Niktalab who is a Persian poet and her daughter is Poopak Niktalab.

He worked voluntarily at Poetry Council at Office of Poetry and Music of Ministry of culture After retirement to preserve music in Iran; His office had been in Vahdat Hall for 25 years.

He died of a heart attack in Tehran at the age of 85. He was buried in the artists' section of Behesht-e Zahra.

== Partial bibliography ==
- Ganj Nameh Persian lyrics collection, Tehran: Setavand Yazd, 2001
- Saye Sare Alvand (or Sāyahʹsār-i Alvand), Persian lyrics collection, Tehran : Sūrah-i Mihr, [published 2004 or 2005] This book has some poetries in Hamedani dialect.
- Selected Poems, Tehran: Neystan Publishing
- Masnavi soroud farda ("Tomorrow's Anthem")
- From Tehran to Tehran: History of Tehran, Tehran: Tehran Municipality Publications

=== Part of his poem ===
One of his famous Poetries is "Mehraban Mah" (means: The kind moon):

The night came, my kind moon did not come

The bright light of my way did not come ...

The dawn came and the sun blossomed like a flower

But the flower of morning's garden didn't come...

== Poetry collection ==
Divan or Poetry collection of Yavar Hamedani, published by the Iranian Pen Association in a series of books by veterans of contemporary literature, includes poems by Yavar Hamedani in various formats of lyric, ode, quatrain, Mathnavi, composition of quatrain, couplet and native poems in Hamedani dialect. The book was unveiled a year after his death anniversary.
