= Pattern-making policy of the Islamic Republic =

One of the foreign policy strategies in the Islamic Republic of Iran

The pattern-making policy of the Islamic Republic is an idea derived from the Iranian Revolution and the Government of the Islamic Republic of Iran, which states that Iran should be "inspiring" in its foreign policy and present its governing style as a pattern (Persian: الگو, romanized: olgu, also meaning "template, model") for other countries, especially Islamic countries. The purpose of this patterning is not necessarily to provide objective copies of Guardianship of the Islamic Jurist, and pattern-makers can reconstruct their perception of religious democracy.

This policy is in fact one of the ways to export the revolution and develops the theory of Umm al-Qura.

The executive tools of this policy are based on three elements of public diplomacy, the use of the tribune of international organizations, and the support of Islamist groups such as Hezbollah in Lebanon and Hamas. The policy of Hezbollah in Lebanon in recent years and the establishment of the government of Nouri al-Maliki in Iraq after the fall of Saddam Hussein have been steps in line with this policy.

== Modality ==
The pattern of exporting the revolution in the foreign policy of the Islamic Republic of Iran, is defined and determined within the framework of the doctrine of "Islamic Umm Al-Qura" (united Islamic nation). This means that the pattern of exporting the revolution in the Government of the Islamic Republic of Iran is based on the idea of "established revolution" of a peaceful, exemplary, cultural and discourse nature. The leadership dimension of united Islamic nation in the Islamic world and its global mission is emphasized and focused.

Because the position and centrality of the Islamic Republic of Iran as the center of this theory, requires the preservation of its survival, but its survival does not negate its mission and transnational responsibility to other Muslims and the oppressed. Thus, the consolidation of the Islamic Revolution in the form of the Islamic Republic of Iran does not mean forgetting and neglecting the global and humane mission of the Islamic Revolution, but on the contrary, strengthening the Islamic Republic increases its duty towards other nations and human beings. Hence, the pattern of exporting the revolution finds an extroverted nature that focuses on the external environment of the Islamic Republic.

The foreign policy of the Islamic Republic finds a demanding nature that makes the issuance of the revolution necessary and even vital. Nevertheless, the pattern of the Islamic Revolution remains peaceful. Beyond this, exporting a model of the revolution, has a patterning nature. In a way, Iran's Islamic Republic is trying to export the Islamic Revolution by patterning the Islamic Republic and introducing this model to the world, especially Muslims and the oppressed.

The task and mission of the Islamic Republic is to create an Islamic pattern society and state within Iran, and to introduce and promote this pattern of the developed Islamic justice state model to other nations and countries. Because the Islamic government, like the religion of Islam, is all-encompassing and universal and is not limited to a specific geography, nation and race. Therefore, the Islamic Republic of Iran, as a pattern society, will inspire other nations and countries to establish a similar society and government.

The Islamic Republic, which has inspired other societies and will be emulated by other nations and countries, is an Islamic government. A government that, unlike the modern nations or governments, which is secular in nature and based on nationalism, has an Islamic nature whose legitimizing ideology is Shia Islam. The most important feature and identifying element of this political system, which derives its legitimacy from the religion and Sharia of Islam, is its Islamic nature.

The most important value that the Islamic Republic possesses, preserves and promotes as an Islamic government is "justice". Justice includes and encompasses other human and social values and virtues. Therefore, the government that should be created as a pattern inside and inspire others, is the "Islamic justice government". The Islamic government of justice is also just and justice-seeking, independent, peace-loving, supportive of Muslims and the oppressed, groundbreaking, anti-oppressive, anti-arrogant and anti-domineering. In this way, this pattern government must first institutionalize these values in domestic politics and then express them in its foreign policy behavior in order to inspire other nations and countries.

The continuation of these procedures and behaviors in foreign policy is both a reproduction of the identity of the Islamic justice of the Islamic Republic and a practical pattern for other nations and countries in the global arena. Therefore, in order to pattern and inspire, the foreign policy of the Islamic Republic of Iran must play national roles such as "stronghold of the revolution", "liberation government", "just government", "supporter of liberation movements", "defender of Muslims", "anti-imperialist", "anti-arrogant government" and "anti-hegemonic government".

== Objectives ==
Presenting and introducing the model of the Islamic justice government peacefully by spreading the values and ideals of the Islamic Revolution, in three ways, provide the objectives of exporting the Islamic Revolution. First, the establishment of a just state and the Islamic pattern society demonstrates the feasibility and efficiency of the Islamic model of government, Islamic values and the discourse of the Islamic Revolution in the contemporary world and in the unjust international system. Thus, the realization of the Islamic society and government as a witness and Islamic pattern in the form of the Islamic Republic of Iran is the mechanism and method of practical proof of the values and ideals of the Islamic Revolution discourse and its dissemination at the regional and international level.

The process that will eventually lead to the formation of a world Islamic community under the rule of the Mahdism government. This also means the formation and establishment of the desired order of the Islamic Republic, which provides benefits to the world order.

Second, the spread of the values of a just Islamic state, especially justice-seeking and anti-hegemony attributes, increases the national security of the Islamic Republic of Iran. Because, with the issuance of the pattern of resistance of the Islamic Republic of Iran as the anti-hegemonic camp, the culture and discourse of resistance against the hegemons and the arrogant becomes pervasive. The prevalence of anti-hegemonic discourse means deterrence against the security threats of the domination system against the Islamic Republic. With the formation of the anti-hegemonic alliance, the Islamic Republic provides an opportunity to balance the hegemonic at the level of the international order.

Third, the pervasiveness of culture and discourse resistance at the regional and internationally level means the expansion of the sphere of influence and scope of interests and power of the Islamic Republic beyond the periphery.

== Implementation ==
In the framework of this policy, mechanisms and tools are used to export the pattern of Islamic revolution, which have a software, cultural and discourse nature. Public diplomacy, the use of international forums and institutions, and spiritual and diplomatic support for Islamic resistance movements and groups are the three components and elements of the soft power of the Islamic Republic to export the pattern of the Islamic Revolution and the pattern of a just Islamic government.
