= Political slogans of the Islamic Republic of Iran =

Political slogans in Iran

Flag of the Islamic Republic of Iran
- Use: National
- Proportion: 4:7
- Design: After the 1979 Iranian Islamic Revolution, the special flag of the Islamic Republic of Iran was replaced by the revolutionaries with the Pahlavi "Lion and Sun flag", and 22 "Allahu Akbar" (in honor of the 22nd day of Bahman, the victory day of the Revolution for Islamic Republic of Iran) were placed on the edge of the green and red colors of the new revolutionary flag.

The Political slogans of the Islamic Republic of Iran is a list of government and anti-government slogans from the beginning of the 1979 revolution until now. Shortly after the revolution a constitutional referendum was held on 2 and 3 December 1979. The referendum resulted in 99.5% of the votes for "Yes to the Islamic Republic".

The number of Iranians eligible to vote on 30 and 31 March 1979, was exactly "22,800,000" people, and the people participated in the referendum were "20,288,021", so 20,147,055 people voted "yes" and only 140,966 voted "no".

Since the Islamic Revolution in Iran in 1979, various groups and factions, both pro and anti with the revolution, have formed and disintegrated. Each period and each group has had its own slogans. The following are some of the slogans.

== Slogans of the Islamic Republic and the revolutionaries ==
These are the usual slogans of supporters of the Islamic Revolution in Iran, which are frequently used in religious and political ceremonies inside Iran, as well as through the national media of Iran.

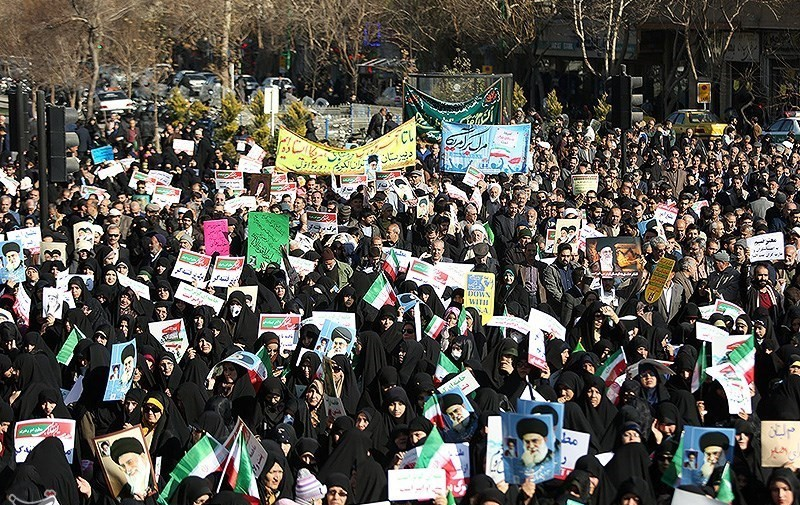
Demonstrations of people in favor of the Islamic Republic, Isfahan, Iran, January 2018

- Neither East, nor West– Islamic Republic!
- Bismilah (in the name of Allah)the Subduer of the Tyrants, and those who have wronged will soon know what fate awaits them(Ash-Shu'ara)
- Yes we can!
- We are not from Kufa, who abandoned Ali left alone!
- Khaybar Khaybar ya yahud (ya Sion)
- No surrender, No peace, Battle against America !
- Hussain , Hussain is our slogan ,Martyrdom is our honour!
- Hit because you hit so well, You are Rostam tahmtan !
- Seyed Haj Majid Precision Strikers, Mow Israel!
- Sepahi pinpoint Strikers! Hit the International!
- Israel will not be in next 25 years
- Haihat mina Zila(Arabic phrase: هیهات منا الذله meaning ذات از ما دور است in Farsi, roughly translated to We will never bow/kneel to oppression)
- Salam Farmandeh (hello commander)
- America can't do a damn thing against us
- Kill Trump
- We must rise
- Allahu Akbar
- Death to America
- Death to opposer of the guardianship of the Islamic jurist
- Death to Israel
- Death to the three corrupters, Carter, Saddam and Begin
- Death to the leaders of sedition
- Death to England
- The blood in our veins is a gift to our leader
- Death to mercenary in charge
- Alas, if Khamenei orders my Jihad, the world's army will not be able to stop me
- We love to fight against the Zionists
- God, God, protect the Khomeini movement until the Mahdi reappearance
- Jerusalem, the share of the people, is around here. Any deal that is made is imaginary

=== Fight, fight until victory ===
"Fight, fight until victory" was a common government political slogan among some political-religious parties and groups in Iran after the victory of the Iranian Revolution and also during the Iran-Iraq war.

As an example, this slogan was considered and used in the Iran-Iraq war and in the Karbala-4 operation.

=== The road of Jerusalem passes through Karbala ===
"The road of Jerusalem passes through Karbala" was a common political slogan among some political-religious parties and groups in Iran since the victory of the Iranian Revolution.

This slogan was first popularised by Ruhollah Khomeini and his supporters during the Iran-Iraq war and in the years after that, to the extent that it largely determined Iran's foreign policy.

In the debate of presidential election between Mir-Hossein Mousavi and Mahmoud Ahmadinejad in 2009, this slogan was also mentioned as one of Ruhollah Khomeini's guidelines.

The "thought" behind this slogan is considered by some to be the continuation of the policy of "exporting" the Iranian revolution by Khomeini to other countries in the region.

=== The Hand of God is revealed, Khamenei has became young again ===
In 2026 after Khamenei's death Islamic regime extensively used this "Khamenei another" slogan to legitimize power transfer to Khamenei's son Agamojtaba.It was used by several media including Assembly of Experts Leadership Ayatullah Kaabi in their speeches.

== Slogans against the Islamic Republic ==
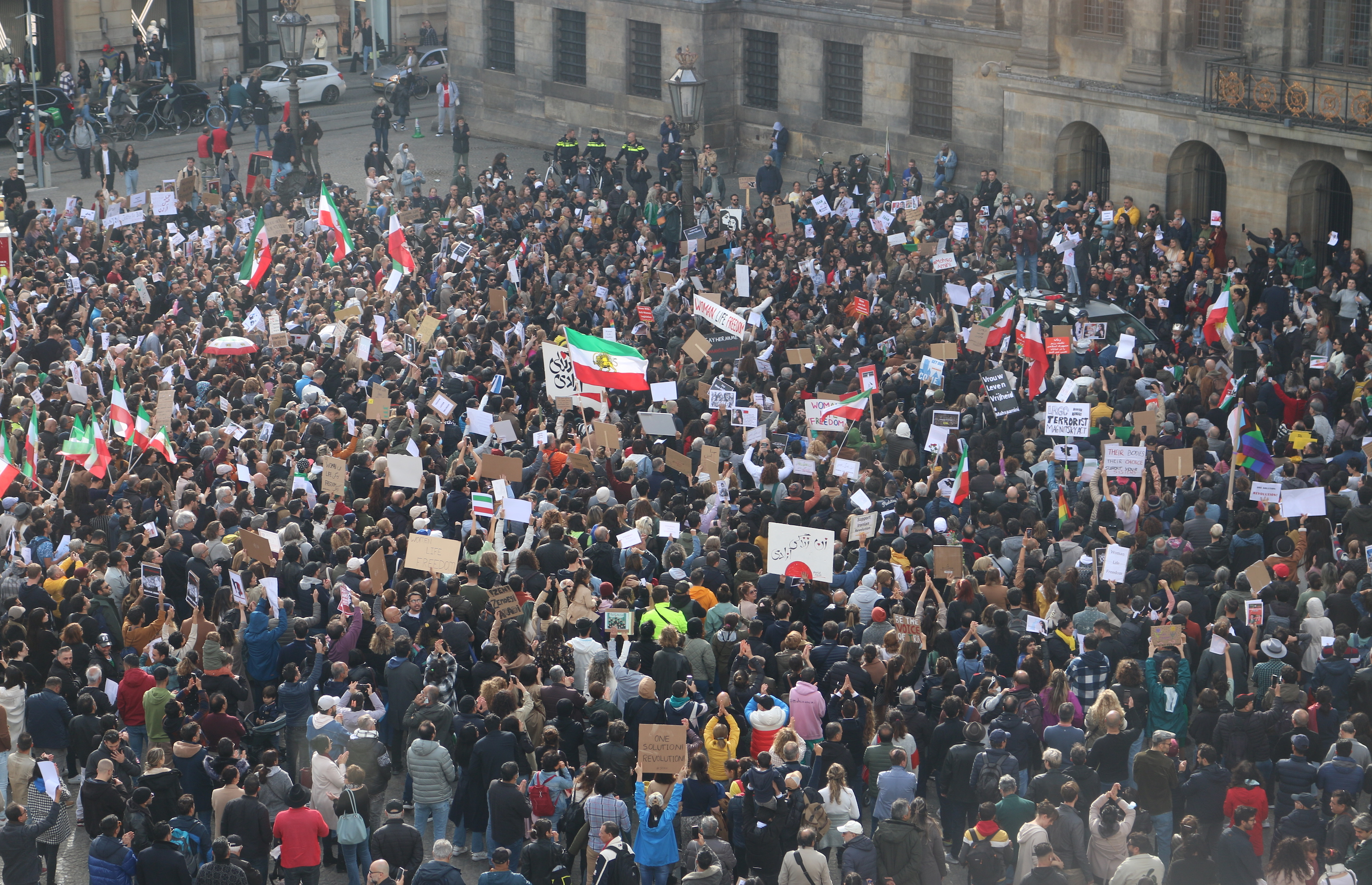
Demonstrations against the Islamic Republic in Amsterdam, October 2022

These are the slogans that are expressed by the Iranians who oppose the Islamic Republic in Iran, which are broadcast in the Persian language foreign media too.

- Child of Iran and Homelands sacrifice
- Until clerics' are buried, This country will not become homeland
- Russia's embassy, is spy's nest
- Not this way, nor that side, Fuck the Supreme Leaders house
- Baraye
- Man, Homeland, Prosperity
- Kurdistan Kurdistan light and eyes of Iran
- Baluchi's share of Iran: Denial, Bullet, Execution Death to the three corrupt: Mullah, Leftist, Mujahid
- Palestine is the common denominator of all the motherfuckers in the world.
- Shove that the Palestinian flag up your ass
- Our hearts are torn our supreme leader is homosexual
- Only on the streets, we take our rights
- Khamanei Zahak, we will bury you
- Mouse Ali (moosh ali)
- Khamenei, murderous murderer. What delusional
- Basiji Sepahi, you're our ISIS
- [Persian rice dish with fish] Fuck you IRGC (Sabzi polo ba Mahi Kose nanat Sepahi)
- All these murder years, death to this Guardians
- We have no bread nor houses, hijab's an excuse
- We are Aryan, we do not worship Arabs
- Zahak is dead, King [will] return
- Our enemy is right here, they lie that it is America
- Back to the enemy facing the homeland
- Reformist, Principlist, it's game over
- Reza Shah, Rest in peace
- “Woman, Life, Freedom”
- Neither Gaza nor Lebanon, My Life for Iran

== See also ==
- Slogans of the 1979 Iranian Revolution
- Ideology of the Iranian Revolution
- Political thought and legacy of Khomeini
- History of the Islamic Republic of Iran
- Background and causes of the Iranian Revolution
- Casualties of the Iranian Revolution
- The Leaders Of The Sedition
- Operation Tyre
- We Are Armed with Allahu Akbar
