= Slogans of the Iranian Revolution =

This article deals with people's slogans during the 1979 Iranian revolution.

== Analysis ==
Sociologists study the slogans of a revolution to study things such as the opinions of the revolutionizing society about the ruling regime, the reasons for opposing it, the reasons for following certain revolutionary leaders, the ideals and beliefs of the revolutionary people, and their desired perfection in the foundation of the new system.

According to Ahmad Salamatian, an expert on Iranian political issues and a representative of the first period of the parliament of Iran after the 1979 revolution, Iranian society has an oral culture that poetry is very important in it; Therefore, poems are significantly present in every collective activity in Iran. According to Abbas Abdi, an Iranian political activists, the issue of political independence, the interference of foreigners and Mohammad Reza Shah's dependence on them was a key issue in the Iranian revolution that was also manifested in the slogans; But the combination of these things with freedom and the Islamic republic was formed gradually. According to Ebrahim Nabavi, slogans of the Iranian revolution were formed in two time periods. According to him, "It seems that since the fall of 1978, there is some order in the slogans and they are thoughtful, but before that, for example, in the demonstrations held by student groups until October and November of 1978, most of the slogans were against the government, the king and tyranny, but the name of Ruhollah Khomeini and the emphasis on the Islamic aspect of the revolution were mentioned in the slogans since the end of 1978, that is, when the leaders of the revolution and the groups that organized the revolution were registering the revolution document in their name."

Farrokh Negahdar, one of the leaders of the left-wing groups opposed to the Shah, says, "The large participation of people from all groups in the revolutionary gatherings was a prominent feature of the days before the victory of the Iranian revolution, but there was a kind of exclusivity and the supporters of Ruhollah Khomeini did not allow other groups to demonstrate in the streets with their own slogans." But Abbas Abdi believes that the slogans of the leftists did not appeal to the public and were not usually spread among the people. Ahmad Salamatian believes that because the various stages of the revolution's peak coincided with religious occasions, the slogans that were given in religious ceremonies such as Ashura, although they were only political, kept the religious structure of these ceremonies. He also believes that before and after the victory of the revolution, the placards of demonstrators and their slogans have a noticeable difference: Before the victory of the revolution, in the placards of various groups and factions, the photos of Mohammad Mosaddegh, Ali Shariati or the photos of the victims of repression can be seen, but after the victory of revolution, only the photo of Ruhollah Khomeini and large religious placards and flags remained.

== List of slogans based on the topic ==
=== Slogans against the Shah's regime ===
- Poor Azhari, you dog of four stars, say again that it is a tape, a tape that has no legs
- You are not honorable, not an Imam, but a complete donkey
- We say we don't want a king, the prime minister will be changed! We say we don't want the donkey, but its saddle will be changed! We don't want the Shah, we don't want Shapour, curse everything mercenary!
- God's help and victory is near, death to this deceitful monarchy (Another example: Death to this government of deceived people)
- We do not live under the burden of oppression, we sacrifice our lives in the path of freedom / we overthrow the Pahlavi dynasty / death to the king (2)
- The imperial system is the cause of all corruption / the Islamic Republic is the epitome of justice

=== Slogans about Ruhollah Khomeini ===
- The Tudeh Party of Iran approves the revolutionary program of Ayatollah Khomeini
- Greetings to Khomeini, the leader of the revolution, defender of independence, freedom and the rights of hard workers
- Greetings to the Muslim guerrillas and devotees of Imam Khomeini
- Greetings to Khomeini / Greetings to zealot / Greetings to Khomeini / Leader of the oppressed
- Greetings to Khomeini, our leader of we zealots
- Greetings from we the workers of Tehran Refinery to Imam Khomeini

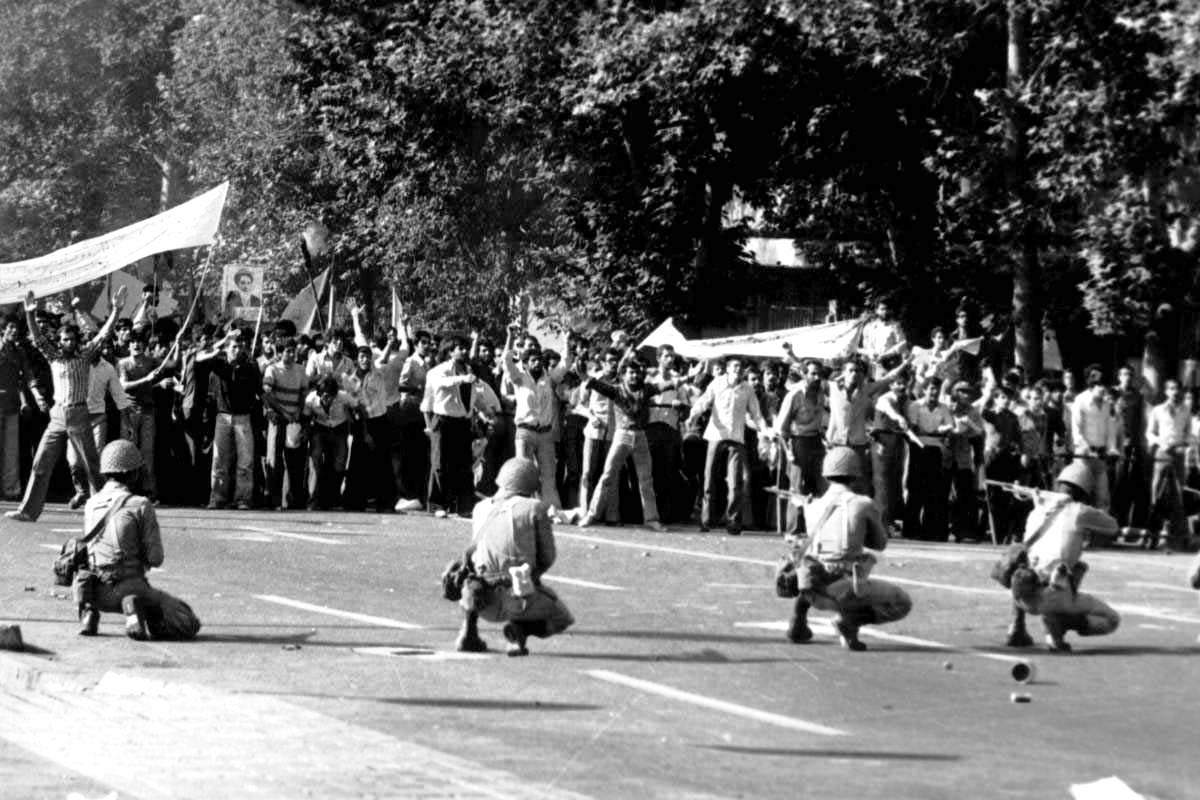
The protest of the revolutionary people of Iran against the Pahlavi government, September 1978

- Worker, peasant, oppressed, sufferer / Khomeini is the leader
- We, the workers, want an Islamic government under the leadership of Imam Khomeini.
- God is the greatest, Khomeini is the leader
- This is the national slogan: God, Quran, Khomeini
- I wrote with my blood, I sacrifice my life, either death or Khomeini
- Khomeini, the idol-breaker / eradicate the Shah.
- Khomeini, Khomeini, you idol-breaking leader, look a sight on us
- The leader of freedmen movement is Ayatollah Khomeini / the most revolutionary man in the world is Ayatollah Khomeini.
- The leader of our Shia movement is Ayatollah Khomeini / he is the emissary of the lord of the age, Ayatollah Khomeini
- Our movement is Hosseini, our leader is Khomeini
- The Shah is being destroyed, Khomeini is the Imam / Independence and freedom of the Islamic Republic is the last word.
- Peace be upon Khomeini the idol-breaker / Death to this ugly lawbreaker.
- Come on, Khomeini is the homeland of the revolution / the role of your opponents is over
- Our lives are sacrificed for you / Same as your Mostafa
- We are all soldiers of you Khomeini / We listen to your command Khomeini.
- Sunday if the sir not coming / Monday is the Revolution.
- Divine blessings on Muhammad / Welcome to our leader.
- I say moment by moment / I say under torture / either death or Khomeini

=== Slogans against the person of the Shah ===
- Death to the Shah
- O Imam of the time, have mercy on us, release us from the hands of this executioner.
- Shah is illegitimate, Khomeini is freedman.
- Shah is bastard, Khomeini is freethoughter.
- Shame on you shameless, give up the kingdom.
- With the help of the masses, we will kill you king.
- With the worker's sledgehammer, with the yokel's sickle, let's eradicate this cunning king.
- The movement continues until the death of the traitor king.
- This American-affiliated king should be executed.
- Shah commits crimes, Carter supports.
- To the blind eyes of the Shah, winter is also spring (referring to the spring weather of February 1979)
- Until the Shah is not shrouded, this country will not be a country
- It is rainy today, it is legal to kill the king
- Today the weather is cloudy, the death of the king is certain
- We don't want milk and bananas, we don't want the thief king (in schools)
- O traitorous king, you should be displaced / You have ruined the land of the homeland / You have killed the youth of the homeland, sighs and wails / You shrouded thousands of people, sighs and wails / Death to the king

=== Slogans against Farah (Shah's wife) ===
- The king commits crimes, the slut makes pilgrimages.
- Farah, what color are your lingerie? Carter says it has three colors.
- Carter wants Farah with her cuteness, he wants the Oil Company as her dowry.
- Farah get up, prepare the mattress, do the job for Jimmy
- Fari, don't be sad, if Mamali will die, Jimmy will come and take you himself
- Tears in our eyes are salty, Carter is a good match for Farah

=== Slogans against other members of the royal family ===
- Children like to kill ants since childhood, but Pahlavi family has been killing people since childhood.
- About Reza Pahlavi: The crown prince is impossible to reign, the yellow dog is the brother of the jackal.
- About Reza Shah: Whoever does not shits on the grave of the bald Reza, hope to his/her butt don't work properly.
- About Ashraf Pahlavi, the twin sister of Shah (slogan of the neighborhoods of Shahr-e No (the former Red-light district of Tehran)): Shah is our fan, his sister is our colleague.

=== Slogans against the prime minister ===
- This is the only motto of Bakhtiar, bring the Brazier with Opium-smoker's pipe
- Bakhtiar, Bakhtiar, an agent who has no authority of his own, the new dog of the court (another version: a servant who has no authority of his own).
- We don't want Shah, we don't want Shapour, death to these two mercenaries.
- Bakhtiar's cabinet is an American conspiracy.
- Bakhtiar, the Opium juice addicted, must go to Morocco.
- Woe to you Bakhtiar, if Imam does not come tomorrow (another version: if Khomeini comes late).
- Bakhtiar the puppy, sir will come one hundred percent
- One country, one government, that too by the vote of the nation
- Bakhtiar, Bakhtiar, keep your opium-brazier (in response to the slogan made by Bakhtiar's fans, "Bakhtiar, Bakhtiar, keep your fortress")
- Khomeini's statement is to remove the fiend / Bakhtiar's cabinet is a new trick.

=== Slogans showing Iranian identity ===
- Iran is our country, Khomeini is our leader
- Our Iran is a sea of blood, the tyrannical regime of the Shah has been overthrown
- Iran is our homeland, its soil is our shroud
- Iran's army has become Hosseini, the leader of Iran has become Khomeini

=== Slogans related to the army ===
- Be our friend army, in order to preserve the Quran
- Army brother, why fratricide?
- The army of the world is an enemy killer, Iran's army is a brother killer
- An army that is so dispassionate, no nation has never seen
- According to Khomeini, the army is our brother
- We give you flowers, you give us bullets
- The army you are innocent, you are a toy in the hands of the king
- Be with us too army, be a voice with the nation, be on the right path, look who is the enemy.
- The army you are the blood of the nation, how long have you been a prisoner of humiliation?
- The soldier is our brother, the army is our enemy.
- The army commander you are the murderer, the soldier is just a sufferer.
- If there is no army, the king will piss himself.
- The flowers of Iran all withered, our army was a dumb that became more dumber.
- The army is a criminal, a mercenary of colonialism.
- We want a national army, not an American army.
- The army is our brother, Khomeini is our leader.

=== Slogans related to political groups ===
- The only way to liberation is the way of Mojahedin
- The peace of people and the creator be upon on you the warrior (Mojahed)
- The only way of liberation is to join the selfsacrificer (Fedai)
- Selfsacrificer, selfsacrificer, you are our pride
- Salutations to selfsacrificer, the fountainhead of liberation
- The only way to liberation, the warrior (Mojahed) and the selfsacrificer (Fedai) machine gun
- Hail to the selfsacrificer (Fedai), the ultimate warrior

=== Tactical and provocative slogans ===
- Independence, freedom, the Islamic Republic
- The women joined us, the unenthusiastics sat down
- Why are you sitting down, people? Iran has become like Palestine
- O righteous martyr I will come to you, the promised paradise is in front of you, death to the king, death to the king, may the memory of our martyrs live forever.
- Why are you sitting down, people? unless you are a monarchist?
- The only way to happiness: Faith, striving, martyrdom
- The warrior brother, happy your martyrdom
- My martyred brother, your way continues
- The silence of every Muslim is betrayal to the Quran
- Cannons, tanks, and machine guns are no longer effective, even if bullets rain on us day and night
- Cannons, tanks, and machine guns are no longer effective, tell my mother that she doesn't have a son anymore
- I swear by the soul of my mother Fatima, I am not afraid of being killed.
- Alas, if Khomeini orders my striving / the world's army will not be able to stop me.
- I will kill, I will kill the one who killed my brother.
- The Rex of Abadan / the book of the Quran / the Kerman mosque / the king set them ablaze / the king set them ablaze
- Woe to the day when we are armed

=== Slogans in approval of the Bazargan's government ===
- Bazargan, the executor of the Quranic order
- Greetings to Bazargan, the Prime Minister of Iran
- Bazargan, Bazargan, you are our prime minister, Bakhtiar, Bakhtiar, you are an American servant
- Bazargan, Bazargan, you are the prime minister of Imam

=== Slogans of folk and humor ===
- We are protesting, we need a husband
- Why did you kill the youth, so you left us without a husband
- The warriors (Mojahedin) are chanting if the king dies, they give lunch

=== Revolutionary poems ===
- Worker, laborer, sufferer / O worker, we unite together... / to eradicate the root of exploitation... / Greetings, greetings, greetings... / Greetings to Khomeini.
- Unity - Unity - Unity / O nation, we unite together... / to eradicate the root of exploitation... / Greetings, greetings, greetings... / Greetings to Khomeini.

=== Slogans for those who were killed ===
- At the dawn of freedom, missing the martyrs
- My martyred brother, your way continues
- Tonight is the night of freedom, missing the martyrs

== See also ==
- Political slogans of the Islamic Republic of Iran
- Ideology of the Iranian Revolution
- Political thought and legacy of Khomeini
- History of the Islamic Republic of Iran
- Background and causes of the Iranian Revolution
- Casualties of the Iranian Revolution
- The Leaders Of The Sedition
