= The Leaders Of The Sedition =

About the opponents of the Islamic Republic of Iran in Iran

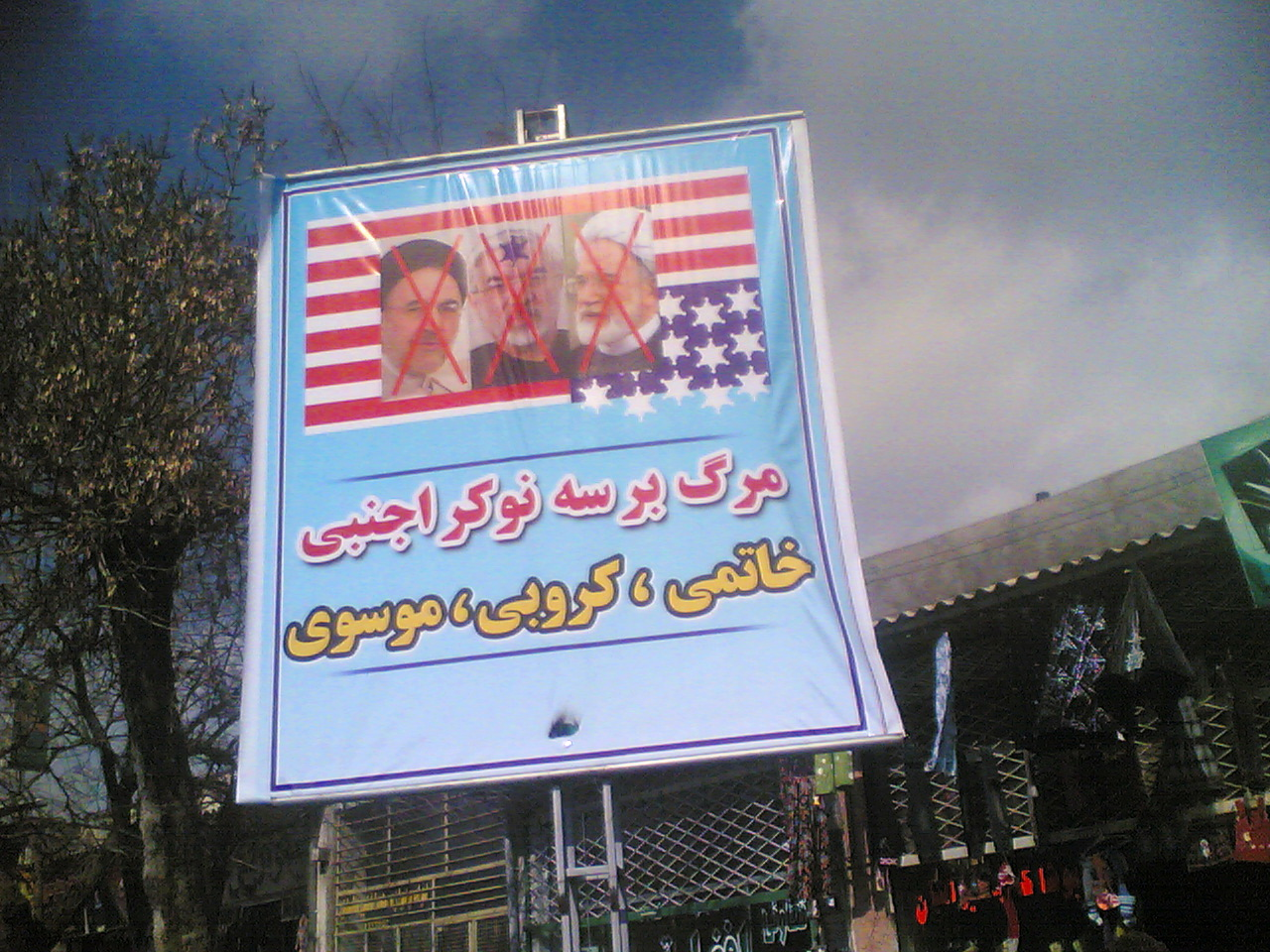
One of the placards of the revolutionary people protesting the incompetence of some political officials in Iran with the slogan: "Death to three foreign servants / Khatami, Karroubi, Mousavi"

The Leaders Of The Sedition (Persian: سران فتنه, romanized: Sarān-e Fetneh) is a phrase used in the government literature of the Islamic Republic of Iran after the presidential election in 2009 to refer to the reformist leaders who oppose the government, especially Mir-Hossein Mousavi, Mehdi Karroubi, and sometimes Mohammad Khatami. Also, the events and unrest after the 2009 Iranian presidential election have been referred to as "sedition" or "sedition current" in Iran.

== Background and etymology ==
"Sedition" or its Arabic equivalent Fitna which is also used in Persian, means putting gold into fire, and it also means putting human into fire. The word "Fitna" has various meanings in the holy book of Islam, Quran, including the meaning of torment, the derivatives of torment, trial and testing, and putting oneself or others in torment.

Ja'far Sobhani, an Iranian Twelver Shia marja, says: "Fitna" is sometimes used to mean blind rebellions that have neither a specific goal nor are they holy. Sometimes it is used to mean the opposing currents of the Islamic Revolution.

According to Borzou Daragahi's report in the Los Angeles Times, according to Islamic Sharia, "seditionist" can deserve the death penalty. At the beginning of Islam, the conflicts and civil wars that arose in the Muslim community in the first two centuries of Islamic calendar were called "Fitna" or "sedition". Cases such as the conflicts between Ali and Mu'awiya that ended when Mu'awiya reached the post of Islamic government, Husayn's departure against Yazid in Karbala, Abd Allah ibn al-Zubayr's departure against Yazid in Mecca, the Movement of the Men of the Black Raiment that led to the overthrow of the Umayyads, all these events are known as "Fitna".

== Sedition after the 2009 presidential election in Iran ==
In the government literature of the Islamic Republic of Iran, the consequences and events after the Iranian presidential election in 2009 are referred to as "Sedition current" or "Sedition of 88".

The expressions such as "Fitna current" or "Fitna of the year of 88" are widely used in Iran in the description of the protest movement after the presidential elections of 2009, among government officials and media affiliated with the Islamic Republic of Iran.

Several months after the 2009 Iranian presidential election protests, conflicts and scattered riots of the opponents of the Islamic Republic continued in Iran until December 30, 2009 Iranian pro-government rallies, when the situation finally calmed down with the massive demonstrations of the revolutionary people in determining the red boundaries. After the 30th of December 2009 (Dey 9, 1388 SH), Ammar International Popular Film Festival was formed with subjects shuch as the history of the Islamic Revolution, the soft war, the Dey 9 epic, and the Islamic Awakening. Most of the films of this festival were screened for free at masjids, schools, universities, auditoriums, public parks, theaters and other places across Iran.

=== Reactions ===
Mir-Hossein Mousavi, the leader of the opposition in the 2009–2010 post-election unrest, has accused the government of Islamic Republic of Iran to "political propaganda" in the using of the phrases such as "Fitna".

It seems that since Mohammad Khatami has always played a more moderate role than other reformist leaders and he was also the former president, he was nicknamed "the gray man of reforms" by principlists critics. For this reason, even some principlists were afraid to name him as the leader of sedition, or perhaps they considered him far from this title. For example, Mohammad-Reza Bahonar, one of the principlists representatives of the Iranian parliament, who was criticized by some other principlists as not having clear positions regarding the events related to the 2009 Iranian presidential election protests, three years later, immediately after the parliamentary elections and his re-election in the parliament (April 2012), he declared Mousavi and Karroubi as the leaders of sedition very clearly. He said about the role of Mohammad Khatami during the incidents of 2009: "Khatami was very cruel to the regime during the sedition, but he was not one of the leaders of the sedition."

Habibollah Asgaroladi, a prominent activist of the Islamic Coalition Party, said in a statement: "As a jury, I do not recognize Mousavi and Karroubi as guilty of sedition, but I consider them to be caught in sedition."

On November 25, 2013, following the whispers, comments and implicit and unofficial suggestions of some reformers about ending the detention of Mousavi and Karroubi, Ahmad Jannati, in his Friday prayer sermons, considered the real justice for both of them as an opponent, a death sentence and said that this sentence is due to Islamic modesty has given way to home confinement. Following these positions, Mostafa Mohaghegh Damad considered Jannati's statements during Friday prayer against Islamic law and did not consider Mousavi and Karroubi as examples of opponent. Also, Ali Motahari immediately rejected Jannati's statements, while believing in the faults of Mousavi and Karroubi, he considered their opponents to be the main cause of the electional crisis of 2009. Motahari's stance was appreciated by Morteza Javadi-Amoli, son of Abdollah Javadi-Amoli.

Hossein Shariatmadari, an Iranian journalist, claimed in November 2014: "Based on his evidence, the initial idea of implementing sanctions against Iran has been proposed by the leaders of sedition to the United States."

Heydar Moslehi, the former minister of Iranian intelligence, said in this regard: "The presence of the people disrupted the situation of the seditionists, but it should be noted that the seditionists have not finished their activities. The activity of the seditionists ends when the revolution stops its basic principles. Today there are those who want to diminish the sedition. Some say Imam Hussein forgives "Hurr" so you do not continue and forgive the leaders of the sedition. Our question is why do you compare the leaders of sedition with Hurr? Hurr saw the truth and repented. The leaders of the sedition are by no means comparable to that of Hurr."

Ali Khamenei, the current supreme leader of Iran, said in this regard: "The enemy had made very precise calculations; But well, their calculations didn't quite work out; They did not know about the Iranian nation. The enemy had seen everything behind the scenes. The ones you call them the leaders of the sedition were those who pushed to the middle of the scene by the enemy. Of course they were sinned. They should not become a toy of the enemy; They had to understand immediately. If they first neglect, in the middle of the work, when they realized, they must immediately change the way. Well, they didn't."

== In the 11th government ==
With the election of Hassan Rouhani as the head of the eleventh government of the Islamic Republic of Iran, the use of the words "sedition" and "seditionist" found a new application. Criticism of Rouhani due to seditionists' support for him in 2013 Iranian presidential election was the first example of this type that was met with Rouhani's reaction. In another case, during the confirmation of Hassan Rouhani's cabinet, some representatives of the Islamic Consultative Assembly accused Rouhani's proposed ministers of "participating in sedition" and tried not to get their vote of confidence.

== See also ==
- Slogans of the 1979 Iranian Revolution
- Political slogans of the Islamic Republic of Iran
- America can't do a damn thing against us
- The policy of exporting the Islamic Revolution
- Theory of Umm al-Qura
- Deviant current
