= Background and causes of the Iranian Revolution =

The Iranian Revolution was the Shia Islamic revolution that replaced the secular monarchy of Shah Mohammad Reza Pahlavi with a theocratic Islamic Republic led by Ayatollah Ruhollah Khomeini.

Its causes continue to be the subject of historical debate and are believed to have stemmed partly from a conservative backlash opposing the Westernization and secularization efforts of the Western-backed Shah, as well as from a more popular reaction to social injustice and other shortcomings of the ancien régime.

== Background (1906–1977) ==
Shi'a clergy (or Ulema) have historically had a significant influence in Iran. The clergy first showed themselves to be a powerful political force in opposition to Iran's monarch with the 1891 tobacco protest boycott that effectively destroyed an unpopular concession granted by the shah giving a British company a monopoly over buying and selling tobacco in Iran. To some the incident demonstrated that the Shia ulama were "Iran's first line of defense" against colonialism.

=== Reza Shah ===
The dynasty that the revolution overthrew – the Pahlavi dynasty – was known for its autocracy, its focus on modernization and Westernization as well as its disregard for religious and democratic measures in Iran's constitution.

Considered the founding father of modern Iran by contemporary historians, Army General Reza Shah Pahlavi replaced Islamic laws with western ones, and forbade traditional Islamic clothing, separation of the sexes and veiling of women (hijab). Women who resisted his ban on public hijab had their chadors forcibly removed and torn. In 1935 a rebellion by pious Shi'a at the shrine of Imam Reza in Mashhad was crushed on his orders with dozens killed and hundreds injured, rupturing relations between the Shah and pious Shia in Iran.

=== The last Shah of Iran comes to power ===
Reza Shah was deposed in 1941 by an invasion of allied British and Soviet troops who believed him to be sympathetic with the allies' enemy Nazi Germany. In fact Reza Shah could not trust allied forces due to long history of British and Russian interference, separating parts of Iran and contracts exploiting Iran. His son, Mohammad Reza Pahlavi, agreed to substitute for his father as monarch. Prince Pahlavi (later crowned Shah) reigned until the 1979 revolution with one brief interruption. In 1953 he fled the country after a power-struggle with his Prime Minister Mohammad Mossadegh. Mossadegh is remembered in Iran for having been voted into power through a democratic election. He was selected by the Shah as Prime Minister and introduced to Parliament for approval following Iran's Constitutional procedure. The Shah supported his Prime Minister who defended Iran's right in the International Court of Justice in the Hague to nationalize British-controlled oil fields. Mossadegh was deposed in a military coup d'état organized by an American CIA operative and aided by the British MI6. However, the coup d'etat could not have happened without the critical participation of important Iranian individuals and political factions who had more significant roles than foreign powers.

The Shah maintained a close relationship with the United States, both regimes sharing a fear of the southward expansion of the Soviet state, Iran's powerful northern neighbor. Leftist and Islamist groups attacked his government for violating the Iranian Constitution, political corruption, and political oppression by the SAVAK (secret police).

During the time of Shah's reign, women's rights improved significantly. The urban and secular middle class grew quickly. Many universities and foundations of education were established, and many young people from lower and middle classes were funded so that they could study in the best universities in the West. Most of these new generations trained thanks to the Shah's policies demanded political changes quickly, something that was not supported by traditional sections of society.

=== Rise of Ayatollah Khomeini ===
Shia cleric Ayatollah Ruhollah Khomeini, the leader of the Iranian revolution, first came to political prominence in 1963 when he led opposition to the Shah and his program of reforms known as the "White Revolution", which aimed to break up landholdings owned by some Shi'a clergy, allow women to vote and religious minorities to hold office, and finally grant women legal equality in marital issues.

Khomeini declared that the Shah had "embarked on the destruction of Islam in Iran" and publicly denounced the Shah as a "wretched miserable man." Following Khomeini's arrest on June 5, 1963, three days of major riots erupted throughout Iran, with Khomeini supporters claiming 15,000 were killed by police fire. Khomeini was detained and kept under house arrest for 8 months. After his release he continued his agitation against the Shah, condemning the regime's close cooperation with Israel (it gave Islamic diplomatic recognition, in addition to covert assistance) and its "capitulations" – the extension of diplomatic immunity to all American government personnel in Iran. In November 1964, Khomeini was re-arrested and sent into exile, where he remained for 14 years until the revolution.

A period of "disaffected calm" followed. Despite political repression, the budding Islamic revival began to undermine the concept that 'Westernization equals progress' – this had served as the basis of the Shah's secular regime. The antithesis of this idea, that Western culture was Gharbzadegi – a plague or an intoxication that Muslims ought to eliminate from their society/culture/lives – was introduced by intellectual Jalal Al-e-Ahmad and became part of the ideology of the revolution. Also spreading and gaining listeners, readers and supporters during this time were Ali Shariati's vision of Islam as the one true liberator of the Third World from oppressive colonialism, neo-colonialism, and capitalism; and Morteza Motahhari's popularized retellings of the Shia faith. Most importantly, Khomeini preached that revolt, and especially martyrdom, against injustice and tyranny was part of Shia Islam, and that Muslims should reject the influence of both capitalism and communism with the slogan "Neither East, nor West – Islamic Republic!" (Persian: نه شرقی نه غربی جمهوری اسلامی).

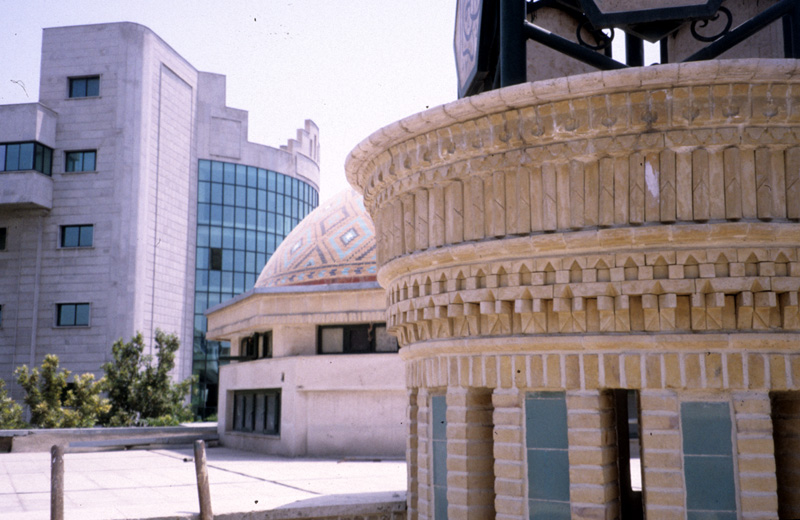
One of Tehran's major hospitals is named after Iranian Islamist leftist Ali Shariati

To replace the shah's regime Khomeini developed the ideology of velayat-e faqih (guardianship of the jurist) as government, postulating that Muslims – in fact everyone – required "guardianship," in the form of rule or supervision by the leading Islamic jurist or jurists. Such rule would protect Islam from deviation from traditional sharia law, and in so doing eliminate poverty, injustice, and the "plundering" of Muslim land by foreign unbelievers. Establishing and obeying this Islamic government was "actually an expression of obedience to God", ultimately "more necessary even than prayer and fasting" in Islam, and a commandment for all the world, not one confined to Iran.

Publicly, Khomeini focused more on the socio-economic problems of the shah's regime (corruption, unequal income and developmental issues), not his solution of rule by Islamic jurists.

He believed a propaganda campaign by Western imperialists had prejudiced most Iranians against theocratic rule.

His book, published in 1970, was widely distributed in religious circles, especially among Khomeini's students (talabeh), ex-students (clerics), and traditional business leaders (bazaari). A powerful and efficient network of opposition began to develop inside Iran, employing mosque sermons and smuggled cassette speeches by Khomeini, amongst other means. Added to this religious opposition were secular and Islamic modernist students and guerrilla groups who admired Khomeini's history of resistance, though they would clash with his theocracy and be suppressed by his movement after the revolution.

=== Opposition groups and organizations ===
Constitutionalist, Marxist, and Islamist groups opposed the Shah:

The very first signs of opposition in 1977 came from Iranian constitutionalist liberals. Based in the urban middle class, this was a section of the population that was fairly secular and wanted the Shah to adhere to the Iranian Constitution of 1906 rather than religious rule. Prominent in it was Mehdi Bazargan and his liberal, moderate Islamic group Freedom Movement of Iran, and the more secular National Front.

The clergy were divided, allying variously with the liberals, Marxists and Islamists. The various anti-Shah groups operated from outside Iran, mostly in London, France, Iraq, and Turkey. Speeches by the leaders of these groups were placed on audio cassettes to be smuggled into Iran. Khomeini, who was in exile in Iraq, worked to unite clerical and secular, liberal and radical opposition under his leadership by avoiding specifics – at least in public – that might divide the factions.

Seen as a proxy for the Russian menace in the north, Marxists groups were illegal and ruthlessly suppressed by SAVAK internal security apparatus. They included the communist Tudeh Party of Iran; two armed organizations, the Organization of Iranian People's Fedai Guerrillas (OIPFG) and the breakaway Iranian People's Fedai Guerrillas (IPFG); and some minor groups. The guerillas aim was to defeat the Pahlavi regime by assassination and guerilla war. Although they played an important part in the chaos of 1978 before the overthrow of the regime, they had been weakened considerably by government repression and factionalization in the first half of the 1970s. They subsequently failed to pose much of a threat to the regime once it had assumed power, although the People's Mujahedin of Iran, an organization that opposed the influence of the clergy, fought against Khomeini's Islamic government.

Islamists were divided into several groups. In addition to the People's Mujahedin of Iran was the Freedom Movement of Iran, made up of religious members of the National Front of Iran who wanted to use lawful political methods against the Shah; they were led by Bazargan and Mahmoud Taleghani.

The Islamist group that ultimately prevailed contained the core supporters of Ayatollah Khomeini. Amongst them were some minor armed Islamist groups which joined together after the revolution in the Mojahedin of the Islamic Revolution Organization. The Coalition of Islamic Societies was founded by religious bazaaris (traditional merchants). The Combatant Clergy Association comprised Morteza Motahhari, Mohammad Beheshti, Mohammad-Javad Bahonar, Akbar Hashemi Rafsanjani and Mohammad Mofatteh, who later became the major leaders of the Islamic Republic. They used a cultural approach to fight the Shah.

Because of internal repression, opposition groups abroad, like the Confederation of Iranian students, the foreign branch of Freedom Movement of Iran and the Islamic Association of Students, were important to the revolution.

=== 1970–1977 ===
Several events in the 1970s set the stage for the 1979 revolution:

In October 1971, the 2,500-year celebration of the Persian Empire was held at the site of Persepolis. Only foreign dignitaries were invited to the three-day party, whose extravagances recalled those of Persian King Ahasverus roughly 2,500 years previously. The Ministry of the Court placed the cost at $17 million (in 1971 dollars); Ansari, one of the organizers, puts it at $22 million (in 1971 dollars). Meanwhile, drought ravaged the provinces of Baluchistan, Sistan, and even Fars where the celebrations were held.

By late 1974 the oil boom had begun to produce not "the Great Civilization" promised by the Shah, but an "alarming" increase in inflation and waste and an "accelerating gap" between the rich and poor, the city and the country. Nationalistic Iranians were angered by the tens of thousands of skilled foreign workers who came to Iran, many of them to help operate the already unpopular and expensive American high-tech military equipment that the Shah had spent hundreds of millions of dollars on.

The next year the Rastakhiz political party was created. It became not only the only party Iranians were permitted to belong to, but one the "whole adult population" was required to belong and pay dues to. The party attempted to take a populist stand fining and jailing merchants in its "anti-profiteering" campaigns, but this proved not only economically harmful but also politically counterproductive. Inflation morphed into a black market and business activity declined. Merchants were angered and politicized.

In 1976, the Shah's government angered pious Iranian Muslims by changing the first year of the Iranian solar calendar from the Islamic hijri to the ascension to the throne by Cyrus the Great. "Iran jumped overnight from the Muslim year 1355 to the royalist year 2535." The same year the Shah declared economic austerity measures to dampen inflation and waste. The resulting unemployment disproportionately affected the thousands of recent poor and unskilled migrants to the cities. Cultural and religious conservatives, many of whom were predisposed to view the Shah's secularism and Westernization as "alien and wicked", went on to form the core of the revolution's demonstrators and "martyrs".

In 1977 a new American president, Jimmy Carter, was inaugurated. Carter envisioned a post-Vietnam American foreign policy that exercised power in a more benevolent way—keeping a distance from dictators and tyrants; (for example see Operation Condor). He enlarged the Office of Human Rights created by his predecessor. The office proceeded to send the Shah a "polite reminder" of the importance of political rights and freedom. The Shah responded by granting amnesty to 357 political prisoners in February and allowing Red Cross to visit prisons, beginning what is said to be 'a trend of liberalization'. Through the late spring, summer and autumn, liberal opposition formed organizations and issued open letters denouncing the regime. Later that year a dissenting group (the Writers' Association) gathered without the customary police break-up and arrests, starting a new era of political action by the Shah's opponents.

That year also saw the death of the very popular and influential modernist Islamist leader Ali Shariati, allegedly at the hands of SAVAK, removing a potential revolutionary rival to Khomeini. In October, Khomeini's son Mostafa died. Though the cause appeared to be a heart attack, anti-Shah groups blamed SAVAK poisoning and proclaimed him a 'martyr.' A subsequent memorial service for Mostafa in Tehran put Khomeini back in the spotlight and began the process of building Khomeini into the leading opponent of the Shah.

== General causes ==
The Iranian Revolution had a number of unique and significant characteristics. It produced profound change at great speed and replaced the world's oldest empire with a theocracy based on Guardianship of the Islamic Jurists (or velayat-e faqih). Its outcome – an Islamic Republic "under the guidance of an 80-year-old exiled religious scholar from Qom" – was, as one scholar put it, "clearly an occurrence that had to be explained.…"

=== Surprise and absence of customary causes ===
The revolution was unique for the surprise it created throughout the world, and followed the maxim of appearing "impossible" until it seemed "inevitable".

Some of the customary causes of revolution that were lacking include

- defeat at war,
- peasant rebellion,
- gigantic national debt,
- poor economy
- disgruntled military

The regime it overthrew was perceived to be heavily protected by a lavishly financed army and security services. As one observer put it: "Few expected the regime of the Shah, which had international support and a modern army of 400,000, to crumble in the face of unarmed demonstrators within a matter of months."

Another historian noted the revolution was "unique in the annals of modern world history in that it brought to power not a new social group equipped with political parties and secular ideologies, but a traditional clergy armed with mosque pulpits and claiming the divine right to supervise all temporal authorities, even the country's highest elected representatives."

=== Causes ===
Explanations advanced for why the revolution happened and took the form it did include policies and actions of the Shah, in addition to the mistakes and successes of a myriad different political forces, such as

- the status of Mohammad Reza as a dictator widely believed to be put in place by a non-Muslim Western power, (the United States); whose foreign culture was seen as influencing that of Iran;
- reports of oppression, brutality, corruption, and extravagance;
- basic functional failures of the regime—economic bottlenecks, shortages and inflation; the regime's over-ambitious economic programme;
- the failure of its security forces to deal with protests and demonstrations; and the overly centralised royal power structure;
- a shift in the view held of him by Western politicians and media after the dramatic rise in oil prices thanks to the Organization of the Petroleum Exporting Countries (OPEC);
- a more critical position on human rights in Iran by the administration of US President Jimmy Carter and strengthened economic ties between the United States and Saudi Arabia in the 1970s.

==== Policies and political mistakes of the Shah ====
- His strong policy of Westernization and close identification with a Western power (the United States) despite the resulting clash with Iran's Shi'a Muslim identity. This included his original installation by the Allied Powers and assistance from the CIA in 1953 to restore him to the throne, the use of large numbers of US military advisers and technicians, and the capitulation or granting of diplomatic immunity from prosecution to them, all of which led nationalistic Iranians, both religious and secular to consider him a puppet of the West;
- Unpopular disregard for Islamic tradition exemplified in his 1976 change from an Islamic calendar to an Imperial calendar, marking the beginning of the reign of Cyrus the Great as the first day, instead of the migration of Muhammad from Mecca to Medina. Overnight, the year changed from 1355 to 2535.
- Extravagance, corruption and elitism (both real and perceived) of the Shah's policies and of his royal court.
- His failure to cultivate supporters in the Shi'a religious leadership to counter Khomeini's campaign against him.
- Focusing of government surveillance and repression on the People's Mujahedin of Iran, the communist Tudeh Party of Iran, and other leftist groups, while the more popular Islamist opposition organized, grew and gradually undermined the authority of his regime.
- Authoritarian tendencies that violated the Iran Constitution of 1906, including repression of dissent by security services like the SAVAK, followed by appeasement and appearance of weakness as the revolution gained momentum.

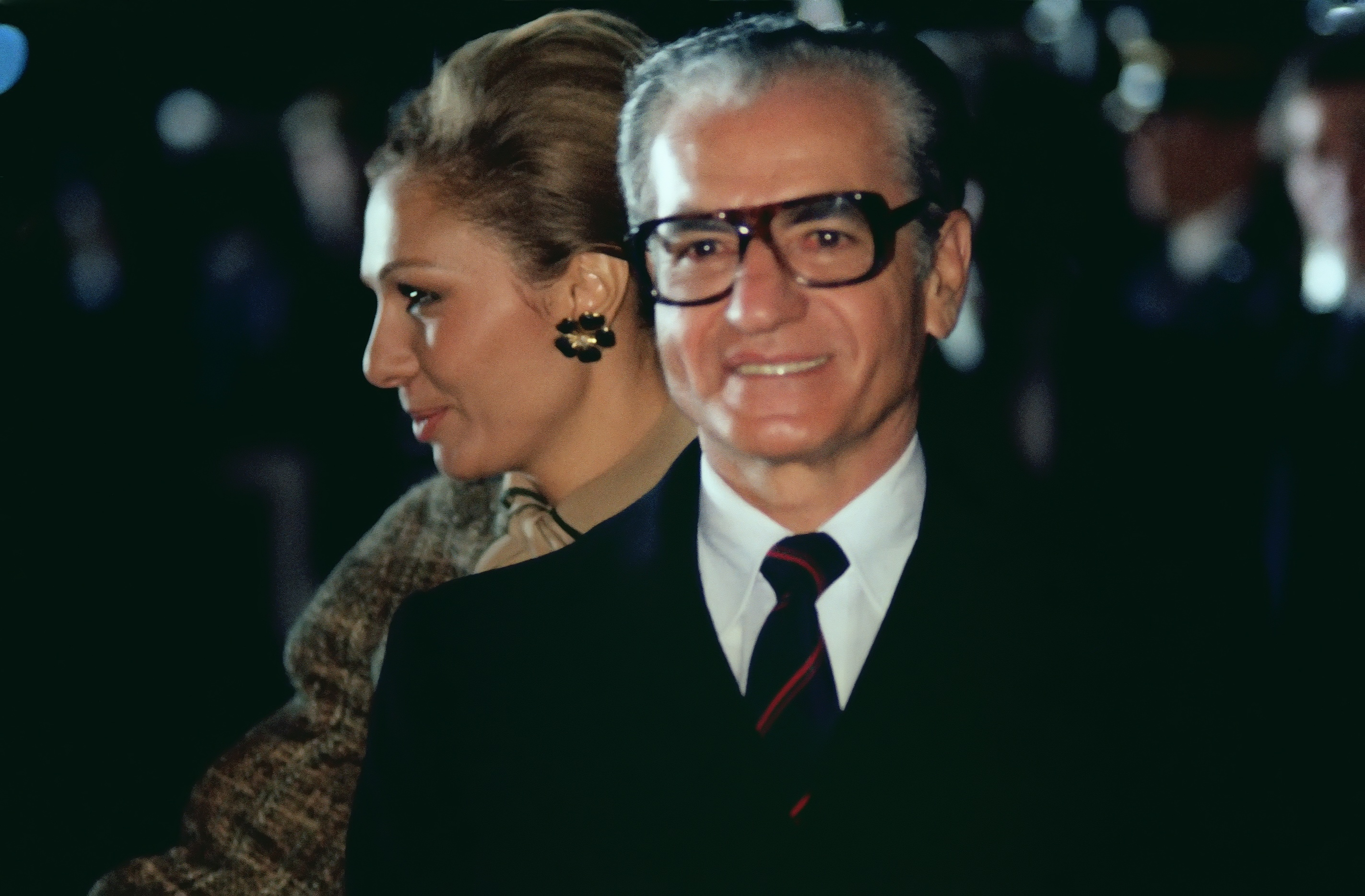
Mohammad Reza Pahlavi and Queen Farah

- "To human rights campaigners at that time, the Shah's great error was to alienate the population with torture and bloodshed. But in hindsight some historians say the Shah was too weak, slow and irresolute in repression", according to Parisa Hafezi of Reuters.
- Failure of his overly ambitious 1974 economic program to meet expectations raised by the oil revenue windfall. A short, sharp period of economic contraction and decline in 1977–78 following a considerable period of economic growth, that according to scholar of revolutions Crane Brinton creates disappointment much greater "than if people had been left in poverty all along"; consider the adage "one can't miss what he never had".
- Bottlenecks, shortages and inflation that were followed by austerity measures, attacks on alleged price gougers and black-markets, that angered both the bazaar and the masses.
- His antagonization of formerly apolitical Iranians, especially merchants of the bazaars, with the creation of a single party political monopoly (the Rastakhiz Party), with compulsory membership and dues, and general aggressive interference in the political, economic, and religious concerns of people's lives.
- His overconfident neglect of governance and preoccupation with playing the world statesman during the oil boom, followed by a loss of self-confidence and resolution couples with a weakening of his health from cancer as the revolution gained momentum. The shah's terminal illness was a secret at the time, but the shah knew he was dying of cancer, and his medication made him "depressed and listless". In addition several of the shah's closest advisers had recently died, and palace personnel were reportedly fired wholesale in the summer of 1978; the regime was without effective leadership.
- Underestimation of the strength of the opposition – particularly religious opposition – and the failure to offer either enough carrots or sticks. Efforts to please the opposition were "too little too late," and no concerted counter-attack was made against the revolutionaries either.
- Failure to prepare and train security forces for dealing with protest and demonstration, failure to employ non-lethal crowd control tactics (troops used live ammunition, not riot shields or water cannons), and use of the military officer corps more as a powerbase to be pampered than as a force to control threats to security. This lack of training turned many protests to disasters, the most notorious one being the events on 8 September 1978, also known as Black Friday.
- The personalised nature of the Shah's government, where prevention of any possible competitor to the monarch trumped efficient and effective government and led to the crown's cultivation of divisions within the army and the political elite, ultimately leading to a lack of support for the regime by its natural allies when needed most (thousands of upper and middle class Iranians and their money left Iran during the beginning of the revolution). The monarch "took a personal interest in the most picayune governmental matters, discouraged initiative by frequently overruling and dismissing officials, and refusing to allow officials to cooperate, for fear of regicidal conspiracies. The shah was careful to meet with each of his top aides and generals individually. In the absence of a fully functioning shah, the system could not function."

==== Failures and successes of other Iranian political or cultural forces ====
- The Ayatollah Khomeini's self-confidence, charisma, and most importantly his ability to grip the imagination of the masses by casting himself as following in the footsteps of the beloved Shi'a Imam Husayn ibn Ali, while portraying the Shah as a modern-day version of Husayn's foe, the hated tyrant Yazid I. Alternately, while in distant Paris, Khomeini filled the figure of the Hidden Imam, sending his messages through special representatives. In so doing he was seen by millions as a savior figure, and inspiring hundreds to feats of martyrdom fighting the regime.
- Success of modernist Islamists Abolhassan Banisadr and Ali Shariati in presenting an Islamic ideology that "appeared modern, liberal and appealing," and in so doing won over much of the Iranian middle class.
- Overconfidence of the secularists and modernist Muslims, of liberals and leftists, in their power and ability to control the revolution, a belief that "the clergy would not be capable of governing the state ... and would have to hand over power to others," so that "even the opponents of the Islamicists accepted their leadership of the revolution" at first, and failure to anticipate Khomeini's "total domination of the Iranian revolution" by studying his writings and try to understand what his true goals were.
- The 40-day (Arba'een) cycle of mourning by Shia that commemorated with new street protests the deaths of earlier protesters, thus strengthening and spreading the anti-Shah sentiments for many months.
- Shrewdness of the Ayatollah Khomeini in winning the support of these liberals and leftists when he needed them to overthrow the Shah by underplaying his hand and avoiding issues (such as rule by clerics or "guardianship of the jurists") he planned to implement but knew would be a deal breaker for his more secular and modernist Muslim allies.
- Cleverness and energy of Khomeini's organizers in Iran who outwitted the Shah's security forces and won broad support with their tactical ingenuity – amongst other things, convincing Iranians that the Shah's security was more brutal than it was.

==== Failures and successes of foreign forces ====
- Policies of the American government: long term policies created an image of the Shah as an American "puppet" with their high profile and the 1953 subversion of the government on his behalf while short-term policies proved as a catalyst to the revolution by pressuring the Shah to liberalize; and then finally the possible heightening of the radicalism of the revolution by failing to read its nature accurately (particularly the goals of Khomeini), or to clearly respond to it.
- Waning support for the shah among Western politicians and media—especially under the administration of U.S. President Jimmy Carter—as a result of the Shah's support for OPEC petroleum price increases. *An Amnesty International assessment on Iran for 1974–1975 stated: "The total number of political prisoners has been reported at times throughout the year to be anything from 25,000 to 100,000". The Carter administration in the US also refused to sell tear gas and rubber bullets to Iran.
- Failures of US intelligence. "Despite decades of pervasive surveillance by SAVAK, working closely with CIA, the extent of public opposition to the Shah, and his sudden departure, came as a considerable surprise to the US intelligence community and national leadership. As late as 28 September 1978 the US Defense Intelligence Agency reported that the Shah "is expected to remain actively in power over the next ten years."(John Pike at the Federation of American Scientists, in 2000) The intelligence community reported to President Jimmy Carter that "Iran is not in a revolutionary or even a 'pre-revolutionary' situation." Carter was also blamed for his lack of support for the Shah while failing to deter opposition.
- Alleged treachery of the Americans and other foreigners. Among those who blame American or Western forces for the collapse of the shah's regime include the director-general of the French intelligence service, who claimed that American President Jimmy Carter "decided to replace" the Shah; one of the shah's generals, who claimed the U.S. "took the Shah by the tail, and threw him into exile like a dead rat"; Iranian expatriates surveyed in Southern California, and Iranians surveyed in Isfahan. The Shah himself subscribed to the theory that the British and international oil companies had plotted to overthrow him, motivated by his increasing control over oil markets and his 1973 nationalization of Iranian oil. These beliefs have usually been mentioned by historians as examples of how "Iranians hostile to the revolution appeared to feel more comfortable blaming outside forces than their own compatriots," rather than as plausible explanations for the revolution.
- Still another theory is that when American general Robert E. Huyser, Deputy Commander of US forces in Europe, went to Iran to encourage the Iranian military to either support the new but non-revolutionary Bahktiar government or stage a coup d'état, he was approached by "representatives of the revolutionary forces" who made it clear to him that "if the United States did not wish its personnel to be harmed or to allow uncontrolled, armed guerrillas, some with pro-Soviet sympathies, to gain access to its sophisticated weapons" he had "better see to it that the military surrendered to the popular revolutionary forces." Thus, according to Sepehr Zabih, Huyser chose between American personnel/materiel, and America's strategic ally in the Persian Gulf, and this explains why Huyser's mission to Iran was accompanied by "the disintegration of the Imperial Army" in the final days of the revolution. It has also been argued that the revolution could not have succeeded without help from inside of Iranian military at some level.
- Khomenei's move in 1978 from Iraq to France, where he was better able to coordinate the nascent Islamic Revolution, was brought about by OPEC policies that discouraged infighting among members — such as Iran and Iraq — in order to create a united front to best take advantage of the oil boom. OPEC had Iran and Iraq sit down and work aside their differences, which resulted in relatively good relations between the two nations throughout the 1970s. In 1978 the Shah made a request to then-Vice President Saddam Hussein to banish the expatriate Ayatollah Khomenei from Iraq, who had been living there in exile for the past 15 years. In light of keeping up good relations with Iran and that Khomenei was not overly supportive of the current Iraqi regime, Hussein agreed to do this.

==== External factors ====
Britain, the United States, and the Soviet Union long competed with each other for the domination of Iran. Britain maintained its control of the Iranian oil industry for a long time using its alliance with power blocs, landlords, and courts and was able to reduce the power of the United States and the Soviet Union in Iran. The British control of the oil was already precarious given their withdrawal of forces "east of Suez" in the beginning of the 1970s. On the other hand, the United States and the Soviet Union were mainly interested in the logistically important location of Iran and wanted an oil concession in the northern part of Iran. The United States used its influence in the army and courts while the Soviet Union had the total support of the Tudeh Party and the Central Council of United Trade Unions. The Shah himself was very interested in involving the United States in Iran's efforts to reorganize the army and boost the economy with US assistance. The US could also reduce the influence of communism in Iran via more overt presence in Iran. As early as the late 1950s, the US was fed up with the widespread corruption in Iranian government and began reducing its financial assistance to Iran. In 1958, the US unsuccessfully attempted to replace the Shah with Iran's chief of staff, a reform orientated politician, to push for social reform in Iran. As the Shah realized how dependent his government and the Iranian economy was on the US, he decided to liberalize his policies. Therefore in 1961, the Shah, with some pressure from the Kennedy administration, opted for Ali Amini group, which had no popular base, but full US support and a clear reform program.

Prime Minister Amini's agenda was to broadcast land reform, reduce corruption, stabilize the economy, limit the power of the Shah, and reduce the size and influence of the Army. Despite having a reformist ideology, Amini did not gain popular support from the National Front, identified with Mossadegh, or the Tudeh Party. Amini's government was very distrusted by the people because of his infamous backing of the Consortium Agreement (re-privatizing Iranian oil in 1954) and was widely criticized by the Tudeh Party as spreading anti-communist propaganda; as a result he was widely perceived as being an American puppet. Amini's government fell apart after fifteen months of struggle with economic dilemmas, popular distrust and the Shah trying to convince Kennedy to shift his support from Amini to him. In 1962, Amini resigned and Asadollah Alam, a faithful friend of the shah who had no intention of reform but to consolidate the power of the monarchy, became the new prime minister and laid the ground for the Shah to reestablish his dictatorship in early 1963.

In the mid-1970s, the Shah was once again placed under US pressure for mistreatment and human rights violations of political prisoners. The paralyzing crisis of the state made the Shah concerned about the future of his throne. Although it was very undesirable for the Shah to introduce another round of liberalization policies, the first round being in the early 1960s, he had no other choice but to do so. Therefore in early 1977, the Shah announced liberalization policies to gain US support once again and resolve the crises of the state. In mid-1977, the Shah allowed an open discussion forum for the Rastakhiz Party to discuss social issues publicly. Following the liberalization policies, mullahs played a crucial role in mobilizing the people against the regime.

=== Doubts about causes ===
Charles Kurzman, author of The Unthinkable Revolution in Iran has postulated that the explanations offered by observers for why the revolution occurred "are only partially valid," and that "the closer we listen to the people who made the revolution – the more anomalies we find."

Kurzman points out that one explanation for the Shah's overthrow – the 40-day (Arba'een) cycle of commemorating deaths of protesters – "came to a halt" on June 17, 1978, a half year before the revolution's culmination. Moderate religious leaders such as Mohammad Kazem Shariatmadari called for calm and a stay-at-home strike, which prevented more casualties to commemorate 40 days later. Kurzman also argues that the mourning rituals in Iran had been a political act only once before.

Could we have said in early 1977 that because Iranian culture includes a forty-day mourning cycle, the country was more likely than other countries to undergo a revolution? I think not. Rather, a knowledgeable observer would probably have noted that this mourning cycle had been put to protest purposes only once in Iranian history, in 1963, and that movement had come to naught.

Alexis de Tocqueville's idea that "steadily increasing prosperity, far from tranquilizing the population, everywhere promoted a spirit of unrest", has been offered by several observers as an explanation for the 1978–79 revolt. But this does not explain why "there was very little oppositional activity" in the recession of 1975–76 when unemployment and inflation were at similar levels to those of 1978. Furthermore, revolutions were conspicuously absent in other "high-growth autocracies" – Venezuela, Algeria, Nigeria, Iraq – in the 1970s and 1980s despite the fact that those countries also suffered from oil wealth problems (corruption, debt, fraud, repression). However, Tocqeueville's other idea that "when a people which has put up with an oppressive rule over a long period without protest suddenly finds the government relaxing its pressure, it takes up arms against it" would seem to solve this anomaly.

Another cause, or partial cause, in doubt is the Shah's liberalization as a result of the encouragement of President Jimmy Carter. Kurzman points out that "even as the shah arrived in Washington" for a state visit in late 1977, "his regime's partial tolerance of oppositional activity was disappearing. ... In November 1977, as the shah ingratiated himself with Jimmy Carter, liberals were in retreat."

Another author, Moojan Momen, questions whether Carter "could have said or done" anything to save the Shah – aside from foregoing his human rights policy – since "any direct interference by America would only have increased resentment" against the pro-American Shah.

== Special theories ==
=== Skocpol's cultural theory ===
Theda Skocpol, an American sociologist specializing in the study of social revolutions, proposed an unprecedented cultural theory to account for the unique aspects of the Iranian revolution, which she admitted falsified her past history-based theories on causes of social revolutions.

Skocpol argued that the revolution diverges from past revolutions in three distinct ways:

1. The revolution does seem to have been solely caused by excessively rapid modernization by the state that led to social disruption. Skocpol's studies on prior modern social revolutions had falsified this popular but simplistic theory.
2. In a departure from historical precedents, the regime's large, modern army and the police were defeated by an internal revolution without the occurrence of a military defeat in foreign war and without external pressures aimed at causing fracture between the state and the dominant social classes.
3. The Iranian revolution is the only modern revolution which was deliberately and coherently fomented by a revolutionary movement consisting of different social classes united under the leadership of a senior Shia cleric Ayatollah Ruhollah Khomeini. This was achieved through demonstrations and strikes advancing with fervor against even lethal military repression. As thus the revolution achieved "what the Western socialists had long only dreamed of doing."

The revolution's success was arguably dependent on the sustained extraordinary efforts by the urban Iranians to wear down and undermine the regime. Despite the negative impact of the Shah's hectic modernization on traditional urban life, it caused more people, displaced villagers and farmers especially, to come into contact with members of traditional urban communities such as bazaaris and artisans, who were also disgruntled with the Shah's reign. Bazaars in particular became centers of associational life, with Islamic groups and occasions tying people together through clerics' interpreting Islamic laws to settle commercial disputes and taxing the well-to-do to provide welfare for devout poorer followers. An endless succession of prayer-meetings and rituals were organized by both clergy and the laity. Bazaars also enjoyed ties with more modern sectors of Iranian society as many Iranian university students were from the merchant class. But since 1970s, Shah aroused the defense and oppositions of the bazaar by attempts at bringing under control their autonomous councils and marginalizing the clergy by taking over their educational and welfare activities.

In the mass revolutionary movements during 1977–8 the traditional urban communities played an indispensable role in making sustained mass struggle possible. The workers relied on economic aid from bazaar during their strikes and the secular opponents depended on alliance with clerics and lay leaders of the bazaar to mobilize the masses. Without these autonomous sources of support and sustenance, successful resistance against the modern political and economic power holders would've been impossible.

The next question is how as part of a unique historical precedence, millions of Iranians were willing to face death in the mass demonstrations against brutal suppression by the army and how the clerics could rise as the leaders of the revolution. This is explained by the potential role of the Shia beliefs and clerical organization in the Iranian society. Shi'a Islam embodies substantial symbolic content to inspire resistance against unjust rule and to justify religious leaders as alternative to secular authority. As Shah aimed to marginalize the Shia clergy and eliminate their influence by its modernization policies, clerics in Qom and their followers developed a populist, anti-Imperialist interpretation of Shia theology to delegitimize Shah for his injustice and his reliance on the anti-Islamic foreign imperialists. The story of Husayn's just revolt against the usurper caliph, Yazid I, and his eventual martyrdom, as well as the belief in the Islamic Messiah, Muhammad al-Mahdi, who clerics claim to represent during his Occultation, were particularly influential in victory of the revolution. As protests against the Shah began, the Shi'a clerics could claim legitimate leadership of the protests and the Husayn legend provided a framework for characterizing the Shah as a modern incarnation of the tyrant Yazid. The revolution also attracted secular Iranians who saw Shi'a Islam and Khomeini's unwavering moral leadership as an indigenous way to express common opposition to an arrogant monarch too closely associated with foreigners. Khomeini's message and appeal spread through existing networks of social links with the urban life and gradually resonated with the majority who saw Shah as being subservient to foreign powers instead of the indigenous demands of his own people. With the inspiration found in Hussein, the devout Iranians consistently defied the army with an audacity unprecedented in European revolutions and despite sustaining casualties. This sustained resistance, gradually undermined the morale of the military rank-and-file and their willingness to continue shooting into the crowds, until the state and the army succumbed before the revolution. As such a very "traditional" part of Iranian life could forge a very modern-looking revolutionary movement. This represented the first revolution to ever be deliberately "made" by a revolutionary ideology and organization that mobilize mass followings.

== See also ==
- Timeline of the Iranian revolution
- Organizations of the Iranian revolution
- Islamic fundamentalism in Iran
- Iran and Red and Black Colonization
- Anniversary of the Iranian revolution
- White Revolution
- Slogans of the Iranian revolution
- Political slogans of the Islamic Republic of Iran

== References and notes ==
=== Bibliography ===
- Amuzgar, Jahangir (1991). The Dynamics of the Iranian Revolution: The Pahlavis' Triumph and Tragedy: 31. SUNY Press.
- Arjomand, Said Amir (1988). Turban for the Crown: The Islamic Revolution in Iran. Oxford University Press.
- Abrahamian, Ervand (1982). Iran between two revolutions. Princeton University Press. ISBN 9780691101347.
- Benard, Cheryl & Khalilzad, Zalmay (1984). "The Government of God" – Iran's Islamic Republic. Columbia University Press. ISBN 9780231053761.
- Brumberg, Daniel (2001). Reinventing Khomeini The Struggle for Reform in Iran By Daniel Brumberg. University of Chicago Press.
- Graham, Robert (1980). Iran, the Illusion of Power. St. Martin's Press.
- Harney, Desmond (1998). The priest and the king: an eyewitness account of the Iranian revolution. I.B. Tauris.
- Harris, David (2004). The Crisis: the President, the Prophet, and the Shah – 1979 and the Coming of Militant Islam. Little, Brown. ISBN 9780316323949.
- Hoveyda, Fereydoun (2003). The Shah and the Ayatollah: Iranian mythology and Islamic revolution. Praeger.
- Kapuscinski, Ryszard (1985). Shah of Shahs. Harcourt Brace, Jovanovich.
- Keddie, Nikki (2003). Modern Iran: Roots and Results of Revolution. Yale University Press.
- Kepel, Gilles (2002). The Trail of Political Islam. Harvard University Press.
- Mackey, Sandra (1996). The Iranians: Persia, Islam and the Soul of a Nation. Dutton.
- Miller, Judith (1996). God Has Ninety Nine Names. Simon & Schuster. ISBN 9780684832289.
- Moin, Baqer (2000). Khomeini: Life of the Ayatollah. Thomas Dunne Books.
- Roy, Olivier (1994). The Failure of Political Islam. translated by Carol Volk. Harvard University Press. ISBN 9780674291409.
- Ruthven, Malise (2000). Islam in the World. Oxford University Press. ISBN 978-0-19-513841-2.
- Schirazi, Asghar (1997). The Constitution of Iran. Tauris.
- Shirley, Edward (1997). Know Thine Enemy: A Spy's Journey Into Revolutionary Iran. Farra.
- Taheri, Amir (1985). The Spirit of Allah. Adler & Adler. ISBN 9780917561047.
- Wright, Robin (2000). The Last Great Revolution: Turmoil And Transformation In Iran. Alfred A. Knopf: Distributed by Random House.
- Zabih, Sepehr (1982). Iran Since the Revolution. Johns Hopkins Press.
- Zanganeh, Lila Azam, ed. (2006). My Sister, Guard Your Veil, My Brother, Guard Your Eyes : Uncensored Iranian Voices. Beacon Press. ISBN 9780807004630.
