= Ideology of the Iranian Revolution =

Ideology behind the Iranian Revolution

The ideology of the Iranian Revolution has been called a "complex combination" of Pan-Islamism, political populism, and Shia Islamic "religious radicalism" (Ervand Abrahamian); "a struggle against paganism, oppression, and empire" (Bernard Lewis). The diverse ideological interpretations of Islam within the grand alliance that led to the 1979 revolution included Khomeinism, Ali Shariati’s Islamic-left ideology (Nikki Keddie), Mehdi Bazargan’s liberal-democratic Islam. Less powerful were the socialist guerrilla groups of Islamic and secular variants, and the secular constitutionalism in socialist and nationalist forms. Contributors to the ideology also included Jalal Al-e-Ahmad, who formulated the idea of Gharbzadegi—that Western culture must be rejected and fought as was a plague or an intoxication that alienated Muslims from their roots and identity.

The slogan chanted by demonstrators—"Independence, Freedom, and Islamic Republic" (Estiqlal, Azadi, Jomhuri-ye Eslami!) — has been called the "pivotal yet broad demand" of the revolutionaries. Revolutionaries railed against corruption, extravagance and autocratic nature of Pahlavi rule; policies that helped the rich at the expense of the poor; and the economic and cultural domination/exploitation of Iran by non-Muslim foreigners—particularly Americans.

== Khomeini ==
The author who ultimately formulated the ideology of the revolution though, was the man who dominated the revolution itself—the Ayatollah Khomeini. He preached that revolt, and especially martyrdom, against injustice and tyranny was part of Shia Islam, that clerics should mobilize and lead their flocks into action, not just to advise them. He introduced Qur'anic terms—mustazafin ('weak') and mustakbirin ('proud and mighty')—for the Marxist terminology of the oppressors-oppressed distinction. He rejected the influence of both Soviet and American superpowers in Iran with the slogan "not Eastern, nor Western - Islamic Republican" (Persian: نه شرقی نه غربی جمهوری اسلامی).

Historian Ervand Abrahamian argues that the revolution had more than one ideology, not just because the revolution was won by a coalition of forces, but because the ideology evolved over time. One very stark point of evolution was between the ideas promoted by Khomeini while fighting for power (based on class struggle and populism) and those forming the basis of rule after the fall of the shah (rule of the guardian jurist).

=== Velayat-e faqih ===
In his famed January–February 1970 lectures to students in Najaf, Khomeini spelled out his system of "Islamic Government" based on the principle of velayat-e faqih. He argued that since Muslims, in fact everyone, required "guardianship," in the form of rule or supervision, true Islamic government must be by the leading Islamic jurist or jurists—such as Khomeini himself. This was necessary because Islam requires obedience to traditional Islamic sharia law alone. Following this law was not only the Islamically correct thing to do, it would prevent poverty, injustice, and the plundering of Muslim land by foreign unbelievers. But for all this to happen, sharia had to be protected from innovation and deviation, and this required putting control of government in the hands of those who were experts in Islamic law -- namely Islamic jurists.

Establishing and obeying this Islamic government was so important it was "actually an expression of obedience to God," ultimately "more necessary even than prayer and fasting" for Islam because without it true Islam will not survive. It was a universal principle, not one confined to Iran. All the world needed and deserved just government, i.e. true Islamic government, and Khomeini "regarded the export of the Islamic revolution as imperative." (His statements on this sensative issue were contradictory. He stated "We shall export our revolution to the whole world. Until the cry 'There is no god but Allah' resounds over the whole world, there will be struggle";] yet other times said, "export of revolution ... does not mean interfering in other nation's affairs", but "answering their questions about knowing God".) (Note: "In offering an alternative, Khomeini did not publicly refer to his work on Islamic government; on the contrary, his entourage later disclaimed this work, arguing that it was either a SAVAK forgery or the rough notes of an student listener.")

However, this plan/ideology was disclosed to his students and the religious community but not widely publicized. (Note: "In offering an alternative, Khomeini did not publicly refer to his work on Islamic government; on the contrary, his entourage later disclaimed this work, arguing that it was either a SAVAK forgery or the rough notes of an student listener.")

=== Populism ===
Throughout the rest of the 1970s, as he gained ground to become the leader of the revolution, Khomeini made no mention of his theory of Islamic government, little or no mention of any details of religious doctrinal or specific public policies. (Note: Khomeini did not "commit himself to precise proposals and specific plans; as one journalist later observed, `imprecision was a way of life` for the entourage.) He did reassure the public his government would "be democratic as well as Islamic" and that "neither he nor his clerical supporters harbored any secret desire to `rule` the country", but mainly and stuck to attacking the Iranian monarch (shah) "on a host of highly sensitive socioeconomic issues": {{blockquote|Accused him of widening the gap between rich and poor; favoring cronies, relatives ... wasting oil resources on the ever expanding army and bureaucracy ... condemning the working class to a life of poverty, misery, and drudgery ... neglecting low-income housing", dependency on the west, supporting the US and Israel, undermining Islam and Iran with "cultural imperialism", often sounding not just populist but leftist ("Oppressed of the world, unite", "The problems of the East come from the West -- especially from American imperialism"), including an emphasis on class struggle. The classes struggling were the oppressed (mostazafin) that he supported, and the oppressors (mostakberin) (made up of the shah's government, the wealthy and well-connected, who would be deposed come the revolution). With this message discipline, Khomeini united a broad coalition movement that hated the shah but included moderates, liberals, and leftists that Khomeini had little else in common with.

Needless to say theocracy of jurists was in conflict with the hopes and plans of Iran's democratic secularists and Islamic leftists. At the same time Khomeini knew a broad revolutionary base was necessary and did not hesitate to encourage these forces to unite with his supporters to overthrow the Shah. Consequently, the ideology of the revolution was known for its "imprecision" or "vague character" prior to its victory, with the specific character of velayat-e faqih/theocratic waiting to be made public when the time was right. Khomeini maintained the opposition to velayat-e faqih/theocratic government by the other revolutionaries was the result of propaganda campaign by foreign imperialists eager to prevent Islam from putting a stop to their plundering. This propaganda was so insidious it had penetrated even Islamic seminaries and made it necessary to "observe the principles of taqiyya" (i.e. dissimulation of the truth in defense of Islam, i.e. lying), when talking about (or not talking about) Islamic government.

=== Ideology in power ===
With the overthrow of the shah in 1979, the ideology of velayat-e faqih waxed and that of populism waned.

- Khomeini and his core group commenced establishing Islamic government of a ruling Jurist (Khomeini being the jurist) and purging unwanted allies : liberals, moderate Muslims (the Provisional Government), then leftist Shi'a (like president Abolhassan Banisadr and the MeK guerillas). Eventually, "one faction", one "social group" was left to benefit financially from the revolution -- "bazaar merchants and business operators linked to the political-religious hierarchy".
- By 1982, having consolidated power, Khomeini also "toned down" his populist language, "watered down" his class rhetoric,"{{sfn|Abrahamian|1993|p=51} took time to praise the bazaars and their merchants, no longer celebrating the righteous, angry poor -- mostazafin now was used as a political term, covering all those who supported the Islamic Republic;
- Emphasized how (according to Khomeini) essential Shi'i clerics were to protecting Islam and Iran; they had kept alive "national Consciousness" and stood as a "fortress of independence" against imperialism and royal despotism in the Tobacco protest of 1891, the Persian Constitutional Revolution of 1906, during Reza Shah's reign, rising up against Muhammad Reza Shah in 1963.

In late 1987 and early 1988, Khomeini startled many by declaring that the Islamic Republic had "absolute authority" over everything, including "secondary ordinances", i.e. sharia law such as the Five Pillars of Islam.

"I should state that the government, which is part of the absolute deputyship of the Prophet, is one of the primary injunctions of Islam and has priority over all other secondary injunctions, even prayers, fasting and hajj."

The announcement was attributed to having to deal with a deadlock between populists and conservatives in his government, where Khomeini was attempting to nudge conservatives in the Guardian Council to not veto an income tax and a "watered-down" labor law (which the council had hitherto opposed as unIslamic).

== Non-Khomeini sources of the ideology ==
=== Gharbzadegi ===
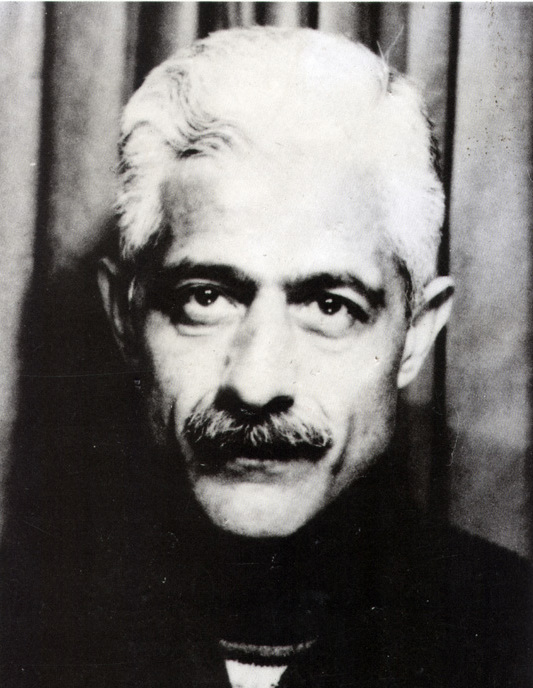
Jalal Al-e-Ahmad

In 1962, Jalal Al-e-Ahmad published a book or pamphlet called of the book Occidentosis (Gharbzadegi): A Plague from the West. Al-e-Ahmad, who was from a deeply religious family but had had a Western education and been a member of the Tudeh (Communist) party, argued that Iran was intoxicated or infatuated (zadegi) with Western (gharb) technology, culture, products, and so had become a victim of the West's "toxins" or disease. The adoption and imitation of Western models and Western criteria in education, the arts, and culture led to the loss of Iranian cultural identity, and a transformation of Iran into a passive market for Western goods and a pawn in Western geopolitics. Al-e-Ahmad "spearheaded" the search by Western educated/secular Iranians for "Islamic roots", and although he advocated a return to Islam his works "contained a strong Marxist flavor and analyzed society through a class perspective."

Al-e-Ahmad "was the only contemporary writer ever to obtain favorable comments from Khomeini", who wrote in a 1971 message to Iranian pilgrims on going on Hajj,

"The poisonous culture of imperialism [is] penetrating to the depths of towns and villages throughout the Muslim world, displacing the culture of the Qur'an, recruiting our youth en masse to the service of foreigners and imperialists..."

At least one historian (Ervand Abrahamian) speculates Al-e-Ahmad may have been an influence on Khomeini's turning away from traditional Shi'i thought towards populism, class struggle and revolution. Fighting Gharbzadegi became part of the ideology of the 1979 Iranian Revolution—the emphasis on nationalization of industry, "self-sufficiency" in economics, independence in all areas of life from both the Western (and Soviet) world. He was also one of the main influences of the later Islamic Republic president Ahmadinejad. The Islamic Republic issued a postage stamp honoring Al-e-Ahmad in 1981.

=== Socialist Shi'ism and Ali Shariati ===
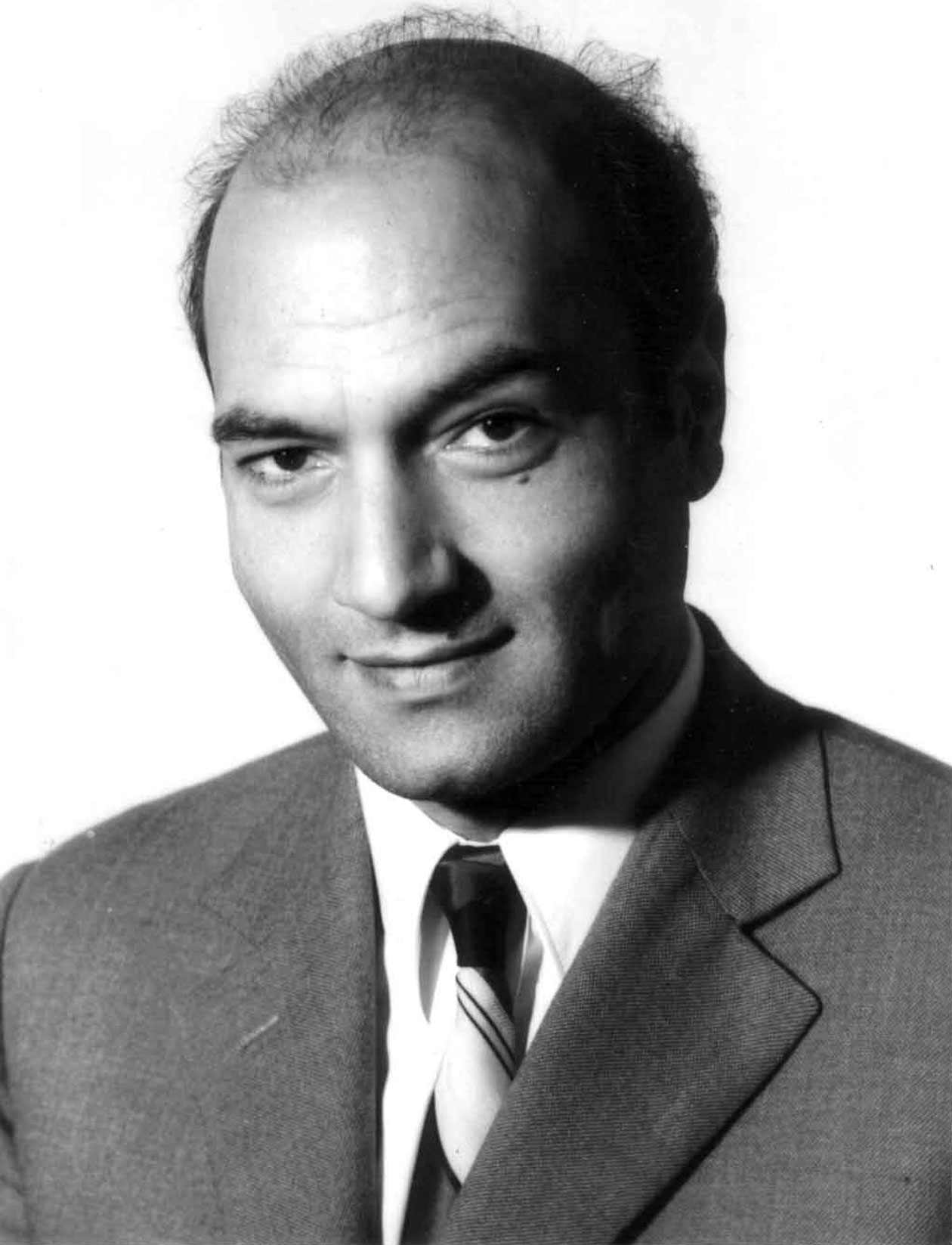
Ali Shariati (Persian: علی شریعتی مزینانی; 1933 - 1977)

One element of Iran's revolution not found in Sunni Islamist movements was what came to be called "Socialist Shi'ism", (also "red Shiism" as opposed to the "black Shiism" of the clerics).

Iran's education system was "substantially superior" to that of its neighbors, and by 1979 had about 175,000 students, 67, 000 studying abroad away from the supervision of its oppressive security force the SAVAK. The early 1970s saw a "blossoming of Marxist groups" around the world including among Iranian post-secondary students.

After one failed uprising, some of the young revolutionaries, realizing that the religious Iranian masses were not relating to Marxist concepts, began projecting "the Messianic expectations of communist and Third World peoples onto Revolutionary Shi'ism.", i.e. socialist Shi'ism. Ali Shariati was "the most outspoken representative of this group", and a figure without equivalent in "fame or influence" in Sunni Islam. He had come from a "strictly religious family" but had studied in Paris and been influenced by the writings of Jean-Paul Sartre, Frantz Fanon and Che Guevara.

Socialist Shia believed Imam Hussein was not just a holy figure but the original oppressed one (muzloun), and his killer, the Sunni Umayyad Caliphate, the "analog" of the modern Iranian people's "oppression by the shah". His killing at Karbala was not just an "eternal manifestation of the truth but a revolutionary act by a revolutionary hero".

Shariati was also a harsh critic of traditional Usuli clergy (including Ayatullah Hadi al-Milani), who he and other leftist Shia believed were standing in the way of the revolutionary potential of the masses, by focusing on mourning and lamentation for the martyrs, awaiting the return of the messiah, when they should have been fighting "against the state injustice begun by Ali and Hussein".

Shariati not only influenced young Iranians and young clerics, he influenced Khomeini. Shariati popularized a saying from the 19th century, 'Every place should be turned into Karbala, every month into Moharram, and every day into Ashara'. Later Khomeini used it as a slogan.

The "phenomenal popularity" of Shariati among the "young intelligentsia" helped open up the "modern middle class" to Khomeini. Shariati was often anticlerical but Khomeini was able to "win over his followers by being forthright in his denunciations of the monarchy, by refusing to join fellow theologians in criticizing the Husseinieh-i Ersha, by openly attacking the apolitical and the pro-regime ulama, by stressing such themes as revolution, anti-imperialism, and the radical message of Muharram, and by incorporating into his public declarations such "Fanonist" terms as "the Mostazafin will inherit the earth", "the country needs a cultural revolution", and "the people will dump the exploiters onto the garbage heap of history."

Shariati was also influenced by anti-democratic Islamist ideas of Muslim Brotherhood thinkers in Egypt and he tried to meet Muhammad Qutb while visiting Saudi Arabia in 1969. A chain smoker, Shariati died of a heart attack while in self-imposed exile in Southampton, UK on June 18, 1977.

Ayatullah Hadi Milani, the influential Usuli Marja in Mashhad during the 1970s, had issued a fatwa prohibiting his followers from reading Ali Shariati's books and islamist literature produced by young clerics. This fatwa was followed by similar fatwas from Ayatullah Mar'ashi Najafi, Ayatullah Muhammad Rouhani, Ayatullah Hasan Qomi and others. Ayatullah Khomeini refused to comment.

=== Mahmoud Taleghani ===
Mahmoud Taleghani (1911–1979) was another politically active Iranian Shi'i cleric and contemporary of Khomeini and a leader in his own right of the movement against Shah Mohammad Reza Pahlavi. A founding member of the Freedom Movement of Iran, he has been described as a representative of the tendency of many "Shia clerics to blend Shia with Marxist ideals in order to compete with leftist movements for youthful supporters" during the 1960s and 1970s. a veteran in the struggle against the Pahlavi regime, he was imprisoned on several occasions over the decades, "as a young preacher, as a mid-ranking cleric, and as a senior religious leader just before the revolution," and served a total of a dozen years in prison. In his time in prison he developed connections with leftist political prisoners and the influence of the left on his thinking was reflected in his famous book Islam and Ownership (Islam va Malekiyat) which argued in support of collective ownership "as if it were an article of faith in Islam."

Taleghani was instrumental in "shaping the groundswell movement" that led to the Iranian revolution and served as the chair of powerful and secret Revolutionary Council during the Islamic Revolution. he was also the first Imam for Friday Prayer in Tehran after the fall of Iran's interim government, In the late July 1979. He clashed with Khomeini in April 1979, warning the leadership against a 'return to despotism.'" After two of his sons were arrested by revolutionary Guards, thousands of his supporters marched in the streets chanting "Taleghani, you are the soul of the revolution! Down with the reactionaries!" Khomeini summoned Taleghani to Qom where he was given a severe criticism after which the press was called and told by Khomeini: "Mr. Taleghani is with us and he is sorry for what happened." Khomeini pointedly did not refer to him as Ayatollah Taleghani.

== Reflected in personal appearance ==
Following the revolution, its ideology became apparent in social, economic and cultural policies.

In terms of dress, western-style neckties for men and uncovered hair, arms, and many other areas for women were banned. But there were non-religious changes as well, such as an emphasis on proletarian dress, manners, and customs, as opposed to Western aristocratic or bourgeois elegance and extravagance of the Shah's era. For example, observers noted in the early days of the revolution the "canteen-like" nature of restaurant meals, meant "to underscore the triumph of the Muslim proletariat." In men's dress, a judge described the "overnight transformation" in February 1979 of the Ministry of Justice in Tehran:

The men were no longer wearing suits and ties but plain slacks and collarless shirts, many of them quite wrinkled, some even stained. Even my nose caught a whiff of the change. The slight scent of cologne or perfume that had lingered in the corridors, especially in the mornings, was absent.

== See also ==
- Political thought and legacy of Khomeini
- Ruhollah Khomeini
- Ali Shariati
- Jalal Al-e-Ahmad
- History of the Islamic Republic of Iran
- Political aspects of Islam
- Slogans of the Iranian revolution
- Political slogans of the Islamic Republic of Iran
