= Office for the Cooperation of the People with the President =

- Abbreviation: OCPP
- Leader: Abolhassan Banisadr
- Founded: December 1979
- Dissolved: 1981
- Newspaper: Enghelabe Eslami
- Ideology: Islamic liberalism Islamic socialism Iranian nationalism
- Political position: Centre-left
- Religion: Islam

Office for the Cooperation of the People with the President (Persian: دفتر هماهنگی همکاری‌های مردم با رئیس‌جمهور) was a political organization in Iran that was closely associated to then-President Abolhassan Banisadr.

Since Banisadr was skeptical of partisan activities in Iran, he did not like the idea of creating a party. However, despite using the name "office", the organization "was created out of necessity to fulfill some, if not all, of the functions of a political party". It had branches all over the country.

== Parliamentary election and presence ==
OCPP issued an electoral list for the 1980 Iranian legislative election, that had candidates shared with the Freedom Movement, the National Front and the People's Mujahedin. The exclusive candidates of OCPP included Fathollah Banisadr (his brother), Mohammad Moballeghi-Eslami (Banisadr's choice for Channel 2) and Mohammad Ja'fari (editor-in-chief of Enghelabe Eslami). Ahmad Salamatian and Ahmad Ghazanfarpour were notable members elected to the parliament under banner of the organization.

According to Houchang Chehabi, the group formed a minority in the parliament. Siavush Randjbar-Daemi estimates that they were less than a dozen deputies, however initially some forty independents were also "ostensibly sympathetic to Banisadr".

== See also ==
- List of Islamic political parties
