= Ahmad Ghazanfarpour =

Member of Parliament of Iran
- In office 28 May 1980 – 17 January 1982
- Constituency: Lenjan
- Majority: 30,951 (88%)

Personal details
- Born: 1942 (age 83–84) Lenjan County, Iran
- Party: Office for the Cooperation of the People with the President
- Other political affiliations: National Front

Ahmad Ghazanfarpour (Persian: احمد غضنفرپور) is an Iranian dentist and activist who served as a member of the parliament from 1980 to 1982.

A former National Front activist, he ran for a seat under the banner of the Office for the Cooperation of the People with the President.
