= Exporting the Islamic Revolution =

Strategy in Iran's foreign policy

Exporting the Islamic Revolution of Iran (Persian: سیاست صدور انقلاب اسلامی ایران) is a strategy in Iran's foreign policy that believes in exporting the teachings of the Iranian Revolution of 1979 to achieve similar results in Islamic and even non-Islamic countries. This policy has been explicitly stated and at various times announced by Ruhollah Khomeini, the founder of the Islamic Republic of Iran. One of the basic slogans of the Islamic Revolution of Iran is the export of the revolution. Accordingly, the purpose is exporting the revolution as a culture, ideology and an intellectual and epistemological method.

In his 1970 work Islamic Government, Khomeini argues that government should/must be run in accordance with traditional Islamic law (sharia), and ruled by a leading Islamic jurist (faqih) providing political "guardianship", and that because God did not will this form of government only for the country of Iran, it cannot be limited to there. He said that efforts to expand Islamic rule would not be limited to proselytizing or propaganda, they would follow the "victorious and triumphant" armies of early Muslims who set "out from the mosque to go into battle", "fear[ing] only God", and following the Quranic command: "prepare against them whatever force you can muster and horses tethered". Khomeini also contended that "if the form of government willed by Islam were to come into being, none of the governments now existing in the world would be able to resist it; they would all capitulate".

== Origins ==
Among the proclamations by Khomeini of the need for exporting the Islamist revolution abroad was one broadcast 15 October 1981 as Teheran radio "reported the execution of 20 more dissidents":

"We have been near zero in our propaganda abroad. We must make unofficial visits aside from the official ones. If we want to export this revolution, we must do something so that the people themselves take government in their own hands, so that the people from the so-called third stratum come to power."

In Ruhollah Khomeini's thought, the founder of the Islamic Republic of Iran, with the development of the responsibilities of the Islamic system, the purpose of establishing such a system is defined at three levels: national, regional (Islamic) and global. Therefore, his comprehensive approach to the Islamic political system during the absence of the Infallible Imam is extroverted and cosmopolitan. That is, he considers the effort to expand the influence of Islam in the world as the original responsibility of the Islamic government beyond national borders. In Khomeini's view, the way to success of such an Islamic cosmopolitan approach is to issue a revolution that has led to the establishment of an efficient Islamic government. The idea of export is the common ideal of most revolutions, although the type and nature of such action varies in their types. In Khomeini's thought and political life based on religious principles, export has its own characteristics. In this approach to realistic idealism, the export of the Islamic Revolution is a two-pronged strategy that, based on the interests of both parties, leads to the pursuit of national interests while pursuing transnational responsibilities. Backgrounds and origins of the theory of exporting the Islamic Revolution according to the writings of Khomeini are:

1. The universality of Islam: According to the Quran and Muhammad, Islam is a universal and general religion.
2. Islam is the religion of justice: According to the Quran, the purpose of sending prophets is to establish justice. According to this principle, justice can not be specific to a particular region or be defined and intended only for a specific people and nation.
3. Mahdism and the idea of a world government in Shiite: One of the basic features of Shiite political thought is the issue of waiting for the world government of Mahdi (The twelfth Imam of the Shiites) that rules justice throughout the world. The promised hope for the establishment of a just world order among the Shiites is both defensive in nature and can be a goal. Therefore, it is natural for the Shiites to seek the world government of Mahdi. When the Islamic Revolution of Iran was victorious, a desire for justice was somehow fulfilled, and from the point of view of some thinkers of the Islamic Revolution of Iran, it could be a prelude to the great revolution of Mahdi.
4. Supporting deprived and oppressed nations: Support for deprived and oppressed nations, which has been and is one of the transnational goals of Iran's foreign policy, is rooted in the religious teachings of Islam and the text of the Quran. Khomeini says in this regard: "Islam has come to save the oppressed".
5. Exporting the revolution in the constitution: In several principles of the Constitution of the Islamic Republic of Iran, the exporting of the Islamic Revolution is mentioned as one of the goals of the Islamic Revolution. For example, Article 154 of the constitution states on the protection of deprived and oppressed nations: "The Islamic Republic of Iran considers human bliss as the ideal of all human society, and recognizes independence, freedom, and the rule of law and justice as the rights of all peoples of the world. Therefore, while completely refraining from interfering in the internal affairs of other nations, it supports the right-seeking struggle of the oppressed against the arrogant everywhere in the world."
6. Principle of "neither East nor West": From the very beginning, the Islamic Revolution of Iran separated itself from the common patterns and succeeded without dependence on the East or the West, and sought to present a new pattern based on the teachings of pure Islam. This important principle was manifested in the expression of the Supreme Leader of the Revolution, Ruhollah Khomeini, as a decree and among the people as a slogan "neither east nor west, just the Islamic Republic."

== The first successful "Islamic" political revolution ==
Iran introduced the first successful "Islamic" political revolution to the world; A revolution based on Islam and the slogan "Allahu Akbar" and based on Shiite ideology and symbolism and with the leadership of the clergy. In addition, Khomeini considered the Iranian experience as a guide for political and ideological change in the Muslim world. His plan was to unite all Muslims in a political and cultural struggle against East and West. By winning this struggle, Iran was ready to propagate its principles in its own country and in the outside world. The principles of ideology of Islamic Iran, which were immediately introduced in the world, have some indicators, some of which are mentioned below:

- Re-emphasis on the rules and teachings of Islam as a full-fledged way of life.
- The belief that the acceptance of the secular and Western model of "separation of religion from the state" is the source of all the social, economic, military and political suffering of Muslim societies.
- The firm belief that the return of Muslim power and success requires a return to Islam and the rule of the divine religion instead of relying on Western and Eastern capitalism, Marxism and socialism.
- Re-introduction of Sharia (Islamic law) to plan and strengthen a desirable and Islamic society that is just and moral.
- The desire to fight (jihad) against all iniquities, even if it requires enduring hardships and, if necessary, martyrdom in the way of God.

Accordingly, from the very beginning of the Iranian revolution of 1979, the export of the revolution was considered as one of the main goals of it. The ideal of exporting the revolution is not limited to the Islamic Revolution of Iran, but even in the universities of Europe and the Americas in the last two centuries is considered as part of the mission abroad of all revolutions.

== Unbalanced theories ==
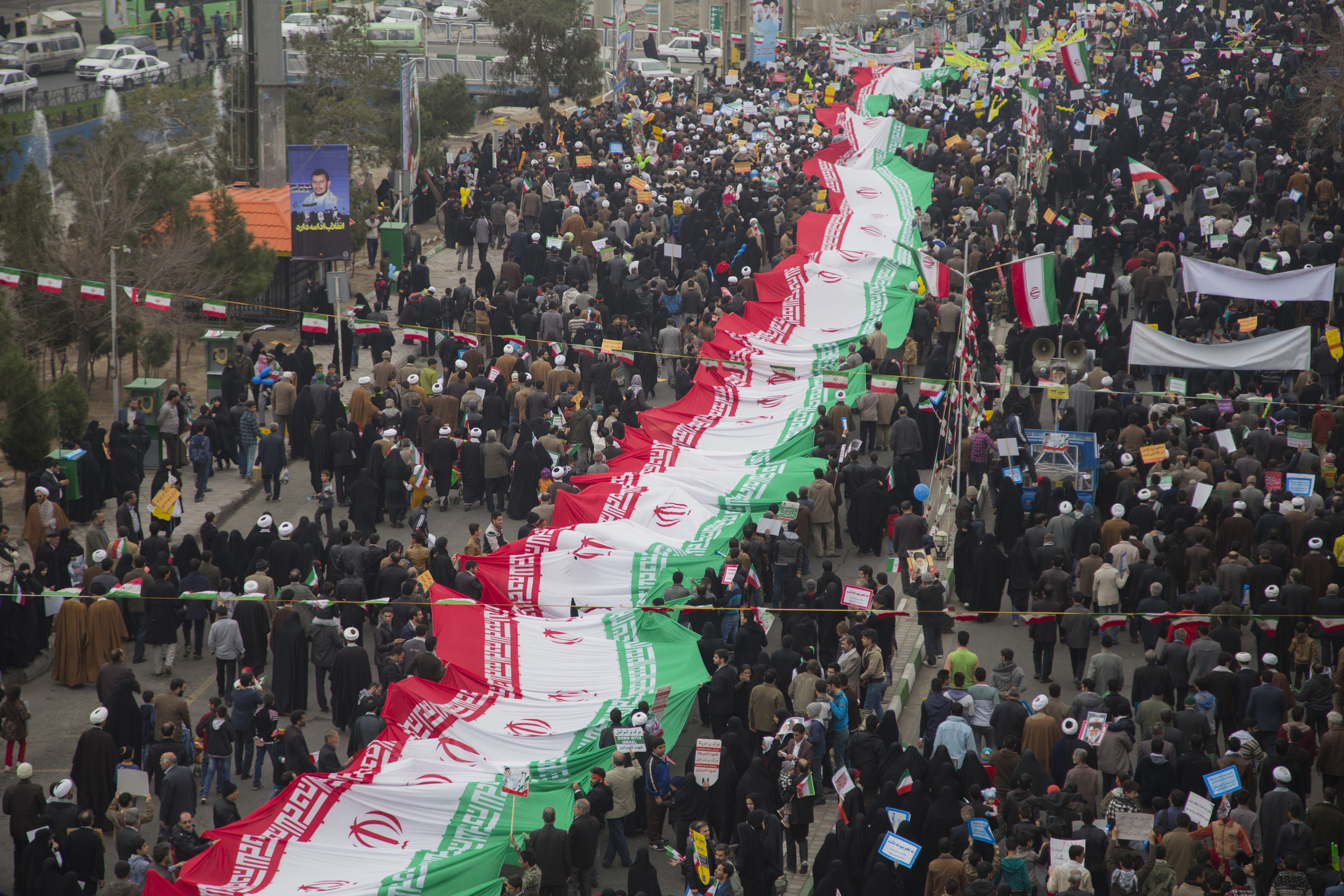
The anniversary of Islamic revolution, Iran, Qom, 11 February 2015.

In total, three theories about The policy of exporting the Islamic Revolution have been proposed by Iranian thinkers and officials after the presentation of this theory by Khomeini. Khomeini (1st Supreme Leader of Iran) and Khamenei (2nd Supreme Leader of Iran) offer a precise position that partially refutes all these three theories. They prove that the concept of The policy of exporting the Islamic Revolution is to exporting Islamic spirituality and Islamic values.

According to Khomeini, the goals of The policy of exporting the Islamic Revolution, are based on the following principles:

- Obligation-oriented and the need to promote pure Islamic ideas
- The general will of nations, especially Muslims
- A principled view of the export of revolution in foreign policy from the perspective of Islam and the unlimited boundaries of Islamic thought

=== The first view: opposition to the export of the revolution ===
A group of Iranian nationalists, regardless of the effective and deterrent international factors, considered the plan to export the revolution and pursue it to be a wrong and harmful thing. The group focused its movement on nationalism. Because the revolution did not take place in the form of a cohesive party or organization, it was an opportunity for this view to flourish. The slogan of national reconstruction in a format in harmony with the international system and custom, regardless of the revolutionary conditions, was the first teaching of the proponents of this view, and therefore they opposed the export of the revolution by declaring priority to domestic reconstruction.

This group believed that all axes of development and growth should be spent on Iran's interests and that Iranianness should be considered the main axis for growth. And global sensitivities must be avoided. They disliked the value treatment of the world system, emphasizing in their slogans a free and independent Iran, communication with all countries and joining the existing global community. They considered Islamic values and the revolution acceptable as the borders of Iran and considered the export of the revolution as an act contrary to international norms. The members of the Interim Government of Iran and Mehdi Bazargan were from this group.

==== Criticism ====
Khomeini rejected this view by explicitly declaring that the export of the revolution was certain. Even if a nation want to think only of preserving their ideal country, Khomeini claimed, they still need to think about exporting the revolution; Because a country that wants to be independent and not be dominated by any power in the world will certainly be attacked and will need to have a strong foothold in other parts of the world to use this capacity when defending itself.

=== The second view: military export ===
Some who were revolutionary elements and considered national borders to be the construction of the colonial era also believed in the military export of the revolution. Proponents of this view believed in conspiracy theory. They attributed any disorder, backwardness, cultural petrification, and demarcation to the planned conspiracy of the colonial powers. The main goal of this view was the constant and continuous attack on the value and status and attempt to destroy other regimes. The group focused on the use of military, guerrilla, and intelligence capabilities, and the arming of liberation movements and endangering the foundations of authoritarian regimes. This view quickly gave way to the first view. In this view, national interests are assumed to be the same as ideal interests, and ideological interests are given priority in foreign policy from a violent and repressive position. In this view, any acceptance of international law was rejected and all their institutions and organizations and their laws were considered totally unacceptable. The realization of revolutionary values and the destruction of these systems through the use of force was considered.

==== Criticism ====
This view was rejected by Khomeini in that it allowed the use of any means. This method and military invasion of the Islamic countries of the Third World is reminiscent of exploitative methods. The destruction of national borders is considered a dangerous and destructive move. Khomeini says: "When we say that our revolution should be exported everywhere, they should not take the wrong meaning from this that we want to conquest countries. We know all Muslim countries from ourselves. All countries must be in their place. We want this thing that happened in Iran and this awakening that happened in Iran and the way that Iranian people distanced themselves from the superpowers and cut off superpower's hands from their own reservoirs, this to happen in all nations and in all governments, this is our wish."

=== The third view: theory of Umm al-Qura and building a pattern society ===
Proponents of this view believed that Iranians should build a single pattern nation at home and use all revolutionary, legal and even violent military means to achieve this goal. In relation to the outside world, they pursued a policy of peaceful politics combined with opportunism and believed that wherever the national interests demanded and the conditions were ready, Iranian should strike at the dependent and authoritarian regimes and if the conditions were not suitable, Iranian should continue the current situation by compromising. This view was a combination of the last two view, and its proponents believed that as long as Iranian could not stabilize the situation at home, they should not take an aggressive stance against the international community, but after Iranian could improve the situation at home and achieve our goals, they must gradually enter into conflict with the world community and the environment. If Iranian interests are at stake and conflict and violence are not working, it is necessary to reach an international compromise and reach an understanding with the powerful countries. In this view, the use of all means to achieve revolutionary goals was considered legitimate and acceptable.

==== Criticism ====
This view is also a kind of passive stance due to the existence of a kind of opportunism in it and since it pays the attacks on the international community, however in a limited extent, it rejected by Khomeini's view.

== Ruhollah Khomeini’s view ==
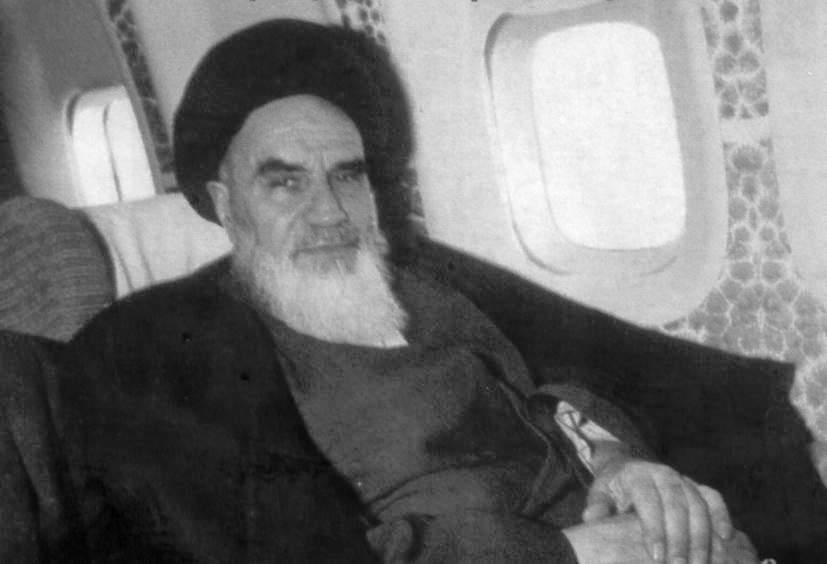
Ruhollah Khomeini on an Air France flight from Paris to Mehrabad Airport (February 1, 1979).

The concepts that Ruhollah Khomeini, the founder of the Islamic Republic of Iran, has explicitly mentioned about The policy of exporting the Islamic Revolution are as follows:

- Introducing Islam as it is: Khomeini says "We say we want to export Islam, it does not mean that we get on a plane and conquest other countries. Neither we can do nor we said such a thing. But what we can do is that, with the devices we have, with the radio and television, with the press, with the groups that go abroad, with these introduce Islam as it is, as God Almighty has said, as it is in our narrations and in the Qur'an, present Islam to the people and present it to the world, and that in itself can be more effective than thousands of cannons and tanks."
- Propagation of the existing spirituality in Iran: Khomeini says "When we say we want to export the revolution, we want the same meaning that was found, the same spirituality that was found in Iran, the same issues that were found in Iran, we want to export this. We do not want to draw swords and guns and attack."
- Reduce the domination of colonizers: Khomeini says "We have repeatedly stated the fact and the truth in our Islamic foreign and international policy that we seek to expand the influence of Islam in the world and reduce the domination of the colonizers." And says elsewhere "The meaning of exporting our revolution is that all nations wake up and all governments wake up and free themselves from this predicament they have and from this domination that they trapped in and save themselves from the fact that their resources are being looted while they living in poverty."
- Fight against Kufr, Shirk and Injustice: Khomeini says "We who say we want to export our revolution and to all Islamic countries, but also to all countries that are arrogant against the oppressed, we want to create a situation where a government is not a tyrant of the murderous and the like."
- Reconciliation between nations and governments: Khomeini says "We say we want to export our revolution, we want to reconcile nations and governments."
- Awakening of the nations: Khomeini says "When we say that our revolution should be exported everywhere, they should not take the wrong meaning from this that we want to conquest countries. We want this thing that happened in Iran and this awakening that happened in Iran and the way that Iranian people distanced themselves from the superpowers and cut off superpower's hands from their own reservoirs, we want this to happen in all nations and in all governments."
- Realization of justice in the world: Khomeini says "I hope that this justice that came to humanity due to the existence of Islam and the saints of Islam, we will be able after two thousand five hundred years of oppression and after fifty years of betrayal and oppression, tyranny and looting, God willing, implement it in Iran first and in the rest of the world later."
- Implementing pure monotheism among Islamic nations: Khomeini says "Thank God, in the rule of our Islamic Republic, there is no difference between the principled, political and doctrinal positions, and everyone is determined to implement pure monotheism among the Islamic nations and to stone the head of the enemy to achieve the victory of Islam in the world in the not too distant future."
- Familiarization of Islamic nations and the oppressed of the world to Islam and the rule of Islamic justice: Khomeini says "The same people who decide to introduce the message of their Islamic Revolution not only to the Islamic countries, but also to the oppressed of the world, to familiarization with the dear Islam and the rule of Islamic justice." And says elsewhere "The export of the revolution does not mean the issuance of aggression and war and the conquest of the lands of others... The export of the revolution means the issuance of the message and mission of the revolution, the issuance of values such as independence, self-sufficiency, pure human qualities, faith, honor, pride, support of the oppressed..."
- Attention to Islam in the world: Khomeini says "Praise be to God, today the power of Iran and the power of Islam in Iran is such that it has attracted the attention of all weak nations, and Islam has been exported all over the world, and this is what we meant by the export of the revolution, and God willing, Islam will overcome atheism everywhere."

== Ali Khamenei’s view ==
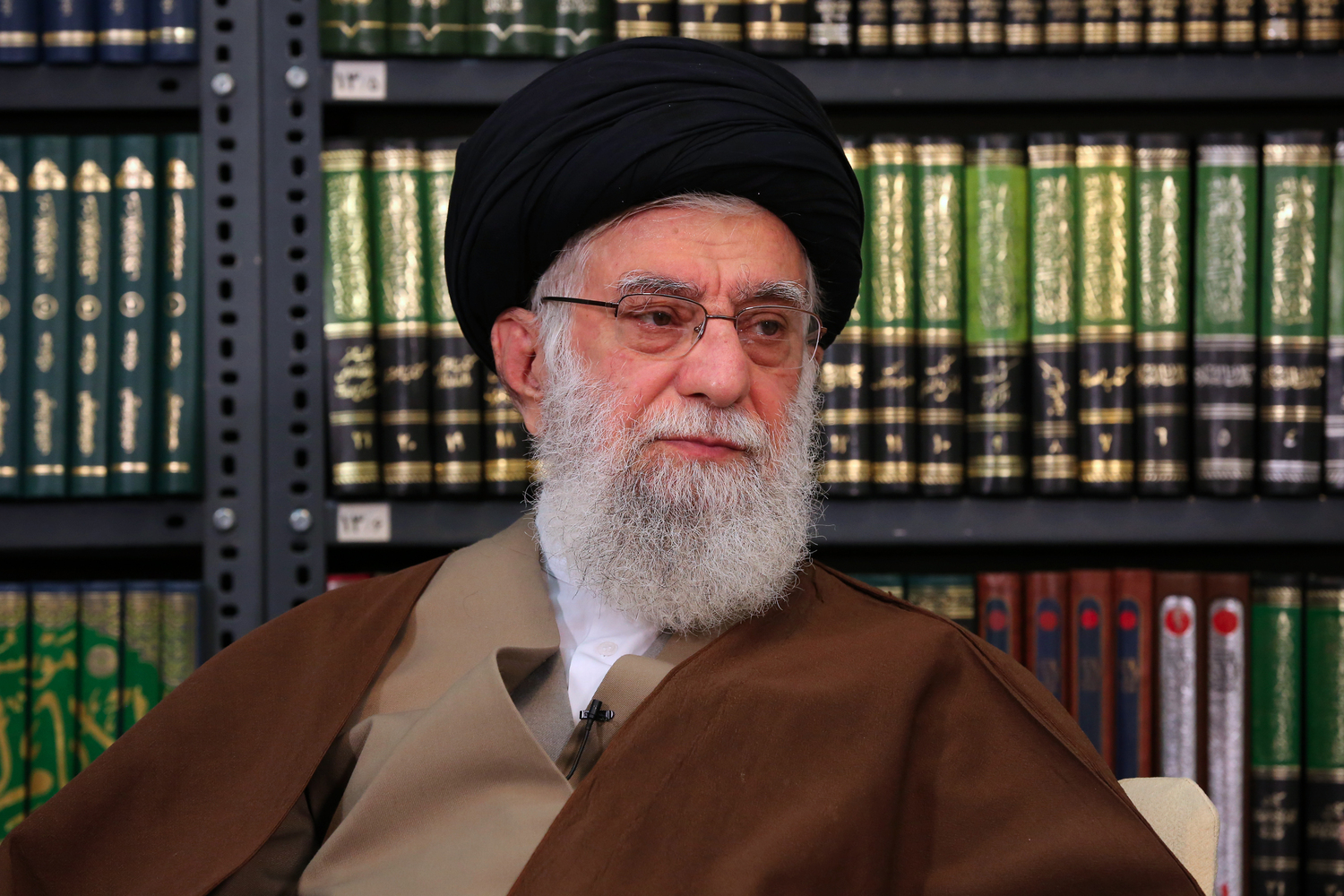
Ali Khamenei, former supreme leader of Iran, February 27, 2020.

Ali Khamenei, 2nd Supreme Leader of Iran, agreed with Khomeini's view about the export of the revolution and says in this regard: "How much the global propaganda slammed the words of our dear Imam (Khomeini) who said: "We will export our revolution to the whole world." The exporting of the revolution did not mean that we would get up and go this way and that with force and power and start a war and force the people to revolt and revolution; This was not the intention of the Imam (Khomeini) at all. This is not part of our policies and principles; It is rejected. This is how they interpreted this sentence so slammed it."

He also said about the meaning of exporting the revolution: "The meaning of the exporting the revolution is that the nations of the world see that a nation with its own strength, relying on its will and determination, and relying on God, can stand and not give up. If the nations see this stability, they will believe and be encouraged to save themselves from the burden of oppression."

Khamenei also said about "exporting the revolution means exporting the humanizing culture of Islam": "After the victory of the Islamic Revolution of Iran, the leaders of world propaganda started a controversy over the exporting of the revolutionary culture of Islam and they begin to advertising invasion on the concept of the exporting of the revolution (with the wrong meaning that they presented from the export of the revolution). All media outlets around the world rely on the fact that the Islamic Republic is trying to export the revolution! Their malice is that they introduce the export of the revolution as the export of explosives and the creation of conflicts in the corners of the world and such things!! This, like the rest of the Western malice propaganda, is a vicious ploy."

Khamenei then went on to say: "Exporting the revolution means exporting the humanizing culture of Islam and exporting sincerity and purity and relying on human values. We are proud of this work and this task. This is the way of the prophets and we must continue this way."

He also says in this regard: "The exporting of this revolution (Iranian revolution) means the export of revolutionary values and the revelation of the tyrants and oppressors of the world, it is our divine duty. If we do not do this, we did negligence."

== General principles of the policy of exporting the Islamic Revolution ==
According to the views of Ruhollah Khomeini (the founder and first Supreme Leader of Iran) and Ali Khamenei (2nd Supreme Leader of Iran), the following general principles can be inferred about the policy of exporting the Islamic Revolution:

- In general, the export of the revolution means emphasizing the realization of values inside Iran and serious efforts to present and disseminate the values and ideals of the revolution abroad.
- The principle of exporting the revolution arose from the principles of the Islamic Shia school due to its universality and relying on the principle of enjoining the good and forbidding the wrong, and if the Iranian revolution was a nationalist revolution with limited national goals, the export of the revolution would not make sense.
- The exporting of the revolution is not an unattainable aspiration; Rather, in spite of the widespread efforts of the global arrogance and their agents, many signs and evidences have emerged indicating the export of the Islamic Revolution and the acceptance of its message and its way by oppressed Muslims.
- The basis of the Iranian revolution was to provide the ground for the spontaneous rise and movement of Muslim nations by modeling, educating and propagating without interfering in the internal affairs of other countries and societies. Iran has not seen itself obliged to impose the Islamic Revolution through the use of force and influence in the structure of other societies.
- Closing borders and being trapped in constraints such as national development and growth regardless of the fate of other nations is neither Islamic nor humane.
- The nature of this thinking - the export of the revolution - is the negation of oppression and tyranny and the denial of silence and passive attitude.
- The main addressees of the message of the Islamic Revolution are the nations, and the main goal is to inform them, and in this context, the concept of exporting the revolution is the enlightened policy which has been fully integrated with the will of nations to change their destiny.
- Militaristic movements that require decision-making and action without will and want of the nations are completely rejected in this policy.
- The export of the revolution is a necessary and revolutionary task, but such a process will be successful if it is done internally in such a way that the revolutionary country of Iran is introduced as a successful pattern.
- The export of the revolution is an inherent and inevitable feature of the Islamic Revolution of Iran. Khomeini considered it his duty to issuance Islam to Islamic lands as much as possible and to respond to the call of the oppressed and Muslims, and he considered the export of the revolution as an offensive tactic against the enemies of the revolution to prevent their danger.
- In addition as a principle in the governing domestic and foreign policy, the export of the revolution is also a popular and religious duty, that is, all Iranian people have a duty to help the realization of Islamic Iran as the Umm al-Qura of Islamic world by focusing on Islamic values in their behavior. And from this perspective, each person's behavior can have a global impact.

== In the constitution of the Islamic Republic of Iran ==
The propagation of the Islamic Revolution is one of the most important points that has been given enough attention in the Constitution of the Islamic Republic of Iran. The concept of the policy of exporting the Islamic Revolution as one of the main components of "neither Eastern nor Western policy" in relation to the issue of independence and countering infiltration against the influence of foreign powers makes sense; The policy of exporting the Islamic Revolution itself is a kind of strategic orientation that aims at the formation of independent governments based on religious values and teachings in Islamic countries.

The preamble to the Iranian constitution states: "Given the content of the Islamic Revolution of Iran, which was a movement for the victory of the oppressed over the arrogant, the constitution provides the basis for the continuation of this revolution at home and abroad, especially in expanding international relations with other Islamic and popular movements, to pave the way for the formation of a single world nation and to continue the struggle for the salvation of oppressed and deprived nations throughout the world."

Article 154 of the constitution of the Islamic Republic of Iran clearly states the purpose of propagation of the revolutionary and Islamic idea, and also expresses its determination to achieve it. This principle bind up the Islamic Republic of Iran to supporting oppressed and deprived nations. According to the Article 154, this support is accompanied by complete abstention from any interference in the internal affairs of other nations and no request does not entail.

Also, in Paragraph 16 of Article 3 of the constitution of the Islamic Republic of Iran, the government of the Islamic Republic of Iran obliges to regulate the foreign policy of the country according to the standards of Islam, brotherly commitment to all Muslims and unwavering support for the oppressed of the world.

== See also ==
- Exporting the revolution
  - Cuban military internationalism
  - Empire of Liberty, theme in American foreign policy
  - Sister republic, foreign policy of revolutionary France
  - World revolution, concept in Marxism
    - World communism
- Hakkō ichiu
- Iranian influence operations in the United Kingdom
- Revolutionary wave
- Workers of the world, unite!
- Regime change
- The Leaders Of The Sedition
- Iran Experts Initiative
- Caliphate
