= Theory of Umm al-Qura =

One of the foreign policy strategies in the Islamic Republic of Iran

The Theory of Umm al-Qura (Persian: نظریهٔ اُمّ‌القُریٰ, means: the mother of cities, the core of nation of the Islamic world) is a theory to explain the foreign policy and analysis of the borders of power of the Islamic Republic of Iran and Iran's position in the Islamic world, which was proposed by Mohammad Javad Larijani in the 1980s. According to this theory, the Islamic world is a single nation and the criterion for the unity of the nation is its leadership. If a country can raise its level of leadership beyond its territorial boundaries with the formation of an Islamic government, it will be in position of "Umm al-Qura" on the Islamic world as the core of the Islamic international government.

The theory of "Umm al-Qura" was first applied by Abd al-Rahman al-Kawakibi about the city of Mecca, which is the religious center of the Islamic world. To solve the problems of the Islamic world, he proposed the "Conference of Religious Leaders and Thinkers, Scholars and Intellectuals of the Islamic World in Mecca as the Ummah of Islam". If a country is recognized as the "Umm al-Qura" of the Islamic world in such a way that its stability is equal to the stability of Islam and the Islamic countries, and its weakness is equal to the weakness of Islam and the Islamic countries, if a conflict made between pursuing the national interests or the public interests of the Muslims, the interests of the "Umm al-Qura" - of course, if it is vital and necessary - take precedence over the Islamic interests. Thus, in the case of a conflict between the two categories, the task of the Islamic international government becomes clear.

== Iran as Umm al-Qura ==
According to the Iranian founders of "Umm al-Qura" theory, Iran was in such a position after the 1979 revolution, and Ruhollah Khomeini, with the establishment of a government based on Guardianship of the Islamic Jurist, was placed in the two positions of the leader of Iran and the leader of the Islamic nation or Ummah. Thus, in addition to national interests, the Iranian government must also address the interests of the Islamic world, and other Islamic countries are obliged to support and defend Iran as the core of nation of the Islamic world. In the event of a conflict between the interests of the core of the Islamic world and the interests of the nation or Ummah, the interests of the nation or ummah always take precedence, unless the issue is to preserve the Islamic system in the core or "Umm al-Qura". According to this theory, the preservation of the core or "Umm al-Qura" takes precedence over anything else, and if necessary, the basic Islamic rules can be postponed to preserve it.

The theory of "Umm al-Qura", along with the theory of Islamic nationalism and the theory of exporting the revolution, is one of the main theories in explaining the position of the Islamic Republic of Iran in the Islamic world. Compared to the other two theories, "Umm al-Qura" emphasizes the concept of "Islamic government" and "expediency of the government" while in Islamic nationalism; The Islamic nation of Iran is analyzed according to the geographical borders of the country within the framework of the modern nation-state concept, and in the theory of exporting the revolution, the ideal of "continuation of the Islamic revolution" is more important than anything.

Some of Ruhollah Khomeini's statements have been cited as evidence of the validity of the theory of "Umm al-Qura". For example, he says somewhere: "Now the eyes of all the people of the world are fixed on Iran ... and if there is a failure, do not think that this failure is for Iran but for all the oppressed in the world." In fact, these statements establish a dialectical relationship between the fate of the Islamic Republic of Iran and the Islamic world, and are close to the theory of "Umm al-Qura" in the way that present the interests of Iran as a tool and a prelude to securing the interests of the Islamic world.

After the end of the Iran-Iraq war and Khomeini's death, Iran's policies and strategies were largely based on the realist theory of "Umm al-Qura", which practically replaced the idealistic theory of "exporting the revolution".

== Elements of the doctrine of Umm al-Qura ==
The basis of the doctrine of "Umm al-Qura" is that if a country is in the midst of the Islamic world as the "Umm al-Qura" in such a way that its defeat or victory is considered the defeat or victory of the whole of Islam, then preserving the "Umm al-Qura" is preferable to anything else and even if necessary, it can overturn the initial rulings. Of course, preserving the "Umm al-Qura" is in the full sense of the word, not preserving the geography of a country, that is, preserving a complete system of government that includes territorial integrity and the special system of government due to which the "Umm al-Qura" became, because government has an external and material nature and a spiritual essence. That is to maintain the system to maintain both aspects.

In explaining this doctrine, Mohammad-Javad Larijani summarizes its elements in the following cases:

- The unity of the nation of the Islamic world: What is clear is that the geographical demarcations and division of the Muslim nation into several nations are the result of a historical process full of oppression and geographical borders have no real validity, but must be accepted because it can not be rejected. Thus, in practice, it limits the possibilities and powers of the Islamic government to the borders of its own country, but in fact, all Muslims are a single nation whose interests are intertwined.
- Leadership is the criterion of the unity of the nation and the guidance of this single nation should be done by the guardian and the Imam. The Imam is responsible for the entire Islamic Ummah. A country which is known as the "Umm al-Qura" of the Islamic world that has a leader who is in fact worthy of leading the Islamic world. Therefore, in order to become the "Umm al-Qura", the strategic position, population, race, etc. are not important, but the criteria are in the guardianship and leadership.
- If a country becomes the "Umm al-Qura", it is obliged to take into account the interests of the whole Muslim nation, and if the rights of the nation are violated, it will rise up and try to take the right of the nation with its ability, so the world powers will try to break it and destroy it, so that no one else will stand in the way of their desires. Also the Muslim nation is obliged to support the "Umm al-Qura" in the face of a serious danger and try to save it. In fact, the "Umm al-Qura" and the Muslim nation each have rights and duties towards each other. "Umm al-Qura" must protect and support the nation, and on the other hand, if "Umm al-Qura" is attacked by the enemies of Islam and the opposition, the nation of Islam has a duty to help "Umm al-Qura" with all its might and existence.
- If there is a conflict between the protection of the interests of the Islamic nation and the national interests in practice, the interests of the Islamic nation always take precedence, unless the existence of the "Umm al-Qura", whose preservation is obligatory on the whole Islamic nation (and not only the "Umm al-Qura" citizens), is endangered. The argument of this doctrine is that if the influence and power of the "Umm al-Qura" increase, other Islamic nations will also move behind its current, and the Islamic uprising and spirit will cause serious problems to all the colonial and oppressive powers of the present world.

== Backgrounds in Iran ==
The plan of "Umm al-Qura" theory is a turning point in the process of reforming the attitude in the field of foreign policy of the Islamic Republic of Iran from idealism to realism and change its emphasis on the solving the internal needs, problems and difficulties of the system. Iran's policies and strategies after the Iran-Iraq war were practically based on this theory. Following the Iraq war against Iran and the adoption of United Nations Security Council Resolution 598, new domestic and foreign policy needs were overshadowed by Iran. Economic and military reconstruction was ordered by the new Iranian government, and looking inward became the new policy of foreign policy officials instead of more serious attention to the outside. All these developments were in the context of "Umm al-Qura" theory. In fact, this theory provided the necessary theoretical basis for interpreting and reviewing Iran's foreign policy.

This doctrine was introduced in a situation where some officials, regardless of national interests, believed that Iran should interfere in the affairs of some certain countries and should take actions. At the beginning of the Iranian revolution, various groups in Iran were in contact with different parts of the world and demanded to interfere immediately with military, financial and spiritual help wherever it is under oppression and colonialism. In such circumstances, it was natural to try to take into account both Islamic considerations and national interests. Therefore, in order to provide both interests, the theory of "Umm al-Qura" was proposed.

== Criticisms ==
Some have criticized this theory as equivalent to complete pragmatism in political action. Critics say the Islamic government should rise up against oppression and injustice and defend the oppressed everywhere in the Islamic world. While the practice of the doctrine of "Umm al-Qura" leads the Islamic society to deal with the sultans of tyranny and blasphemy and uses expediency and being in the valley of pragmatism as the criterion for action. Others believe that although the doctrine of "Umm al-Qura" is a theoretical plan, it can be considered and examined in a situation where all Islamic countries form a unified political unit so that the centrality of an Islamic country and its general leadership is accepted by the Islamic world. But given the reality of the contemporary world, this theory can not explain the reality of the world of politics in the context of Islamic interests.

== See also ==
- Hakkō ichiu
- The Leaders Of The Sedition
- Socialism in one country
