= Ahmad Salamatian =

Iranian politician (1941–present)

- احمد سلامتیان
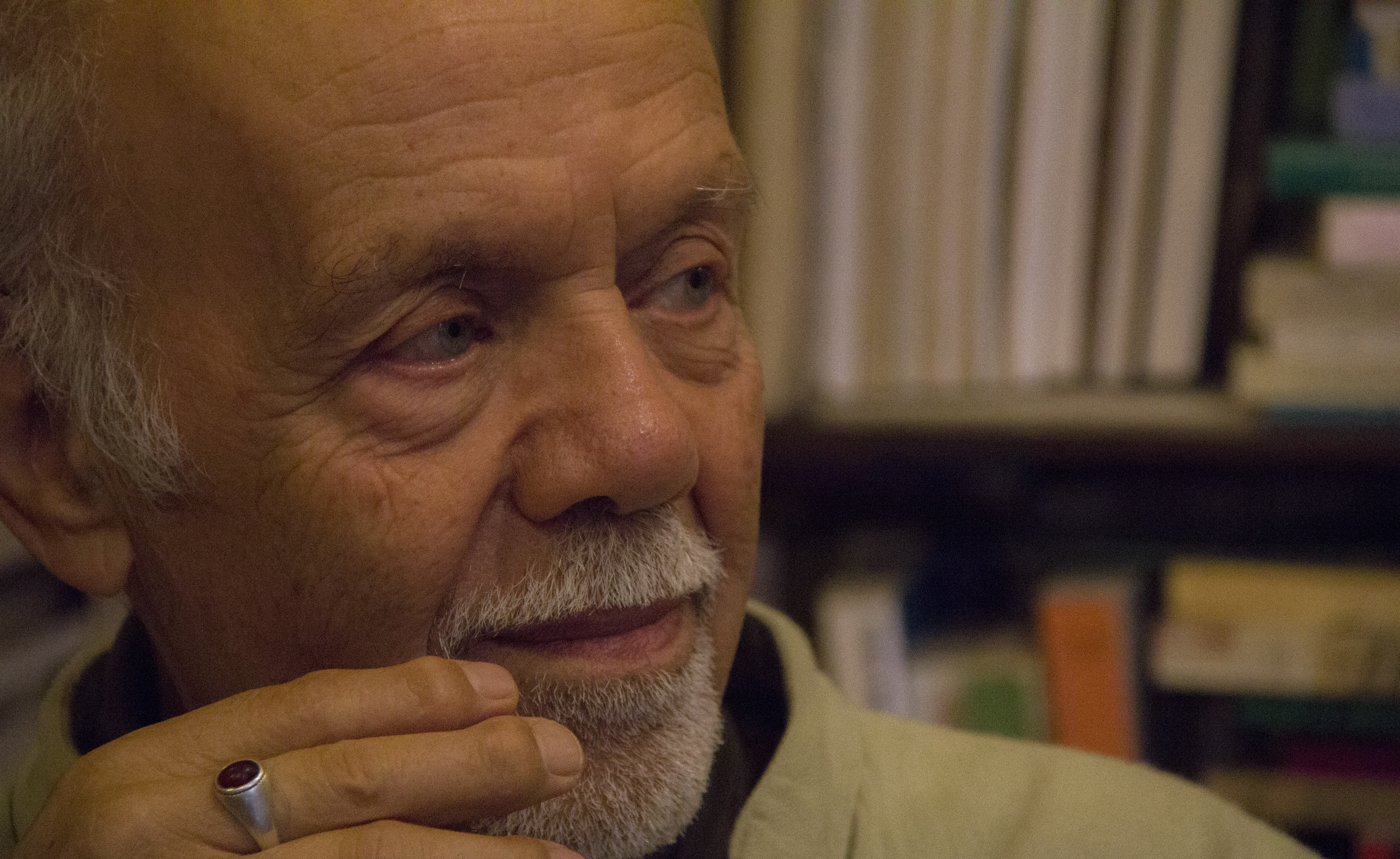

Member of Parliament of Iran
- In office 28 May 1980 – 1981
- Succeeded by: Mohammad Gharazi
- Constituency: Isfahan
- Majority: 180,584 (55.3%)

Personal details
- Born: 1941 (age 84–85) Isfahan, Iran
- Party: Office for the Cooperation of the People with the President
- Other political affiliations: National Front
- Education: University of Paris

Ahmad Salamatian (Persian: احمد سلامتیان; born 1941, Isfahan) is a former Iranian politician. He "played a prominent part in the revolution against the Shah", co-founding the Committee for the Defense of Freedom and Human Rights in 1977, and was the campaign manager of Abolhassan Banisadr in the 1980 presidential election. He was deputy minister of foreign affairs in 1979, and was elected to the Iranian parliament in February 1980. He had lived in exile in France prior to the 1979 Iranian Revolution (gaining a Master of Advanced Studies in political science from the University of Paris in 1966), and returned there in September 1981 after Banisadr was deposed and assassination attempts were made against him. He has written for Le Monde Diplomatique.

Salamatian later said, in response to the release of the film Argo, that he had been one of a number of Iranian officials aware of the 6 US hostages hidden in the Canadian embassy, who had kept quiet for fear of the radical hostage-taking groups. In 2010 he co-authored a book on Iran's 2009-10 "Green Revolution".

== Electoral history ==
Year	Election	Votes	%	Rank	Result
1980	Parliament	181,630	55.3	4th	Won

== Books ==
- (with Sara Daniel) Iran : la révolte verte – La fin de l'islam politique ?, Éditions Delavilla, 2010
