= America can't do a damn thing against us =

Slogan by Iranian leader Ayatollah Ruhollah Khomeini

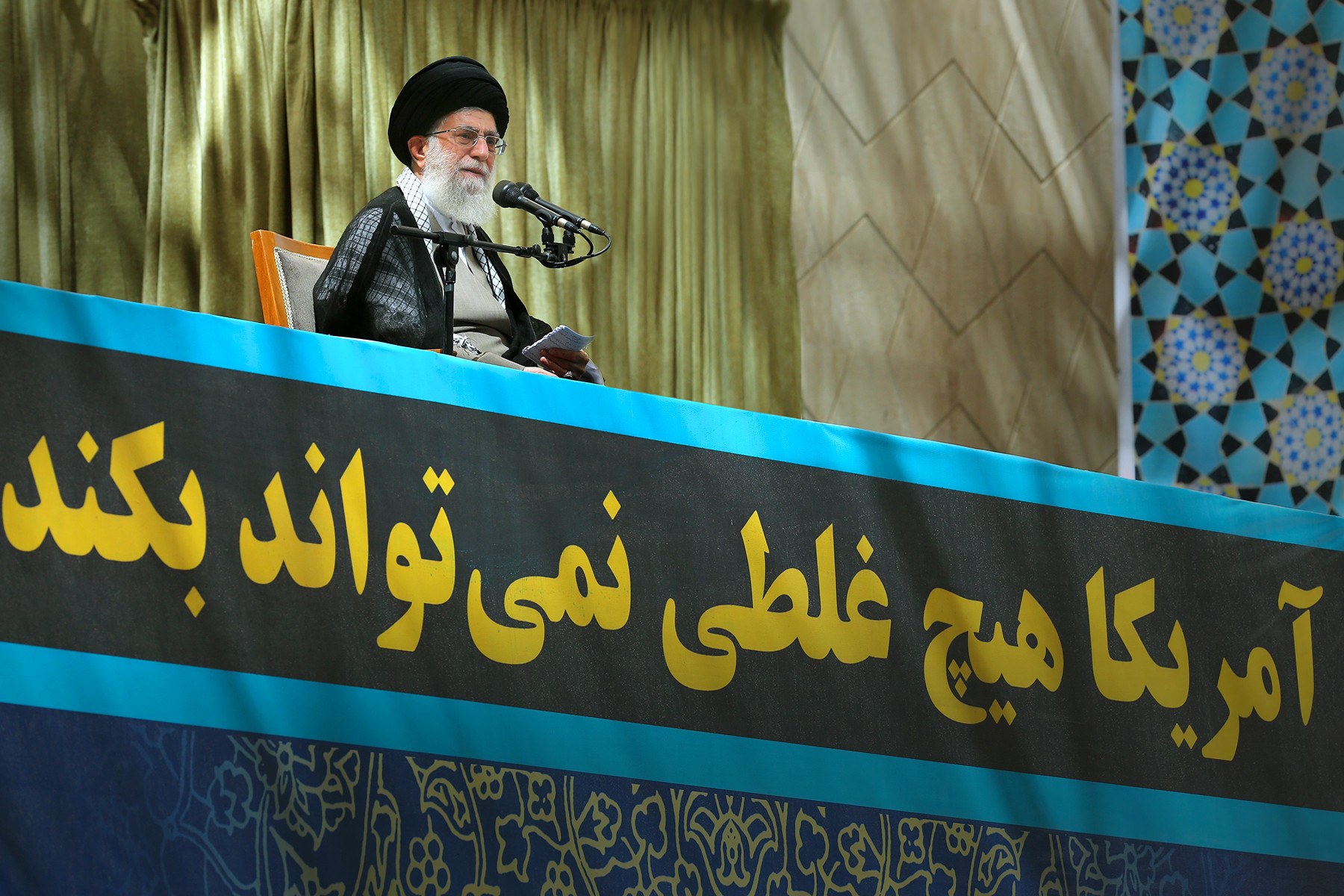
The slogan can be seen in the bottom of Ali Khamenei's speech position on 25th Death Anniversary of Ruhollah Khomeini in his mausoleum, 4 June 2014.

"America can't do a damn thing against us" (Persian: آمریکا هیچ غلطی نمی‌تواند بکند, romanized: Âmrikâ hič ğalati nemi-tavânad bekonad) is a slogan originally used by the former Iranian supreme leader Ruhollah Khomeini during the Iran hostage crisis. It was used for the first time to assure the Iranians that the United States would not be able to restore the ousted Shah of Iran back to the Iranian throne. The statement then became an unofficial slogan for the Iranian Revolution, which resulted in the establishment of an Islamic Republic under Khomeini's rule.

== Application ==
Responding to Iran's request for extradition of the Shah of Iran, Muhammad Reza Pahlavi, United States president Jimmy Carter provided for the Shah's travel plans to Panama. By doing so, Carter sought to eliminate the possibility of the extradition in exchange for hostages who were held by the revolutionary Iran for 444 days (4 November 1979 – 20 January 1981) after a group of Iranian revolutionary students affiliated with Muslim Student Followers of the Imam's Line broke into and entered the Embassy of the United States, Tehran, and took its diplomatic staff hostage. This in turn had been an action in response to the United States offering political asylum to the Shah.

A week after the incident, the sheets and finances of Iran were confiscated by the United States. Yet, in spite of what were deemed by Iran to be international threats, there was still the possibility of holding trials for alleged American spies, and the reaction of Khomeini against the threat of Carter published regularly by international media, was the slogan "America can't do a damn thing against us". The slogan appeared on many walls and banners such as a billboard along the Iran-Iraq border, and a banner which was hung in front of the captured drone as part of the Iran–U.S. RQ-170 incident. The slogan was also used by Ali Khamenei, Khomeini's successor as the Supreme Leader of Iran, or alluded to in varied form. It was also used by some other Iranian officials.
