= Exporting the revolution =

Promotion of a successful revolution abroad

Exporting the revolution is actions by a victorious revolutionary government of one country to promote similar revolutions in unruled areas or other countries as a manifestation of revolutionary internationalism of certain kind, such as the Marxist proletarian internationalism.

Fred Halliday analyzes the traits of the export of revolution by case studies of the French Revolution, the Russian Revolution, and the Iranian Revolution.

== See also ==
- Cuban Revolution
  - Cuban military internationalism
- Cultural Revolution
- Democracy promotion
- Domino theory
- Empire of Liberty
- French Revolution
  - Sister republic
- Interventionism
- Iranian Revolution
  - Exporting the Islamic Revolution
- Regime change
- Revolutionary wave
- Russian Revolution
- Workers of the world, unite!
- World revolution
