= Anarchism in Iran =

Anarchism in Iran has its roots in a number of dissident religious philosophies, as well as in the development of anti-authoritarian poetry throughout the rule of various imperial dynasties over the country. In the modern era, anarchism came to Iran during the late 19th century and rose to prominence in the wake of the Constitutional Revolution, with anarchists becoming leading members of the Jungle Movement that established the Persian Socialist Soviet Republic in Gilan.

Following a coup d'état and the dissolution of the Soviet Republic, the new Pahlavi dynasty undertook the suppression of the remaining anarchist movement. Socialist movements eventually began to reestablish themselves after the Anglo-Soviet invasion, but the Western-backed coup d'état forced many of these movements underground. Anarchist tendencies started to re-emerge from out of the armed struggle movement but was again suppressed during the Islamic Revolution, only re-organizing itself by the turn of the 21st century.

== History ==
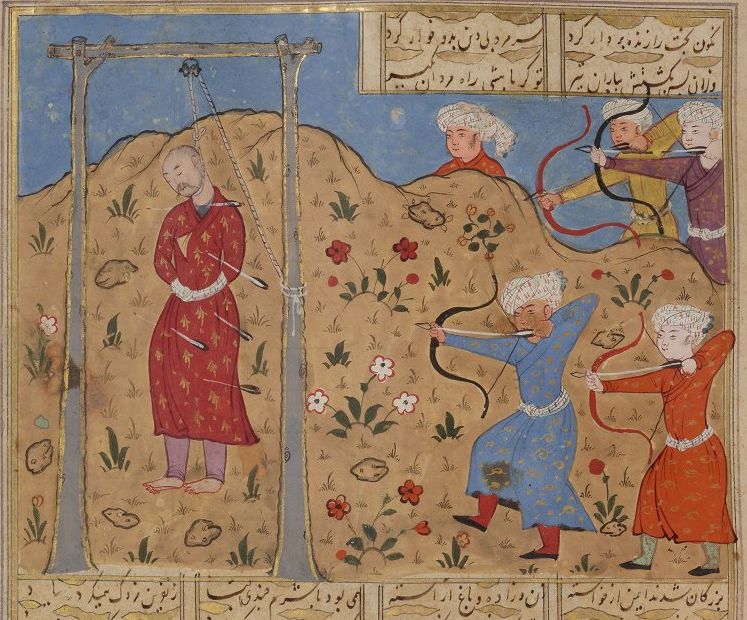
The execution of Mazdak, an Iranian religious reformer during the 6th century

In the time of the Sasanian Empire, the Zoroastrian prophet Mazdak advocated for a form of proto-socialism, called for free love, the abolition of private property and overthrow of the king. He saw sharing as a religious duty and that no one should have more than others, though sources dispute whether he advocated communal ownership or redistribution. The latter claim being that he gave land, possessions, women and slaves from the rich to the poor. He and his thousands of followers were massacred in 582 CE but his teaching went on to influence Islamic sects of the following centuries.

A number of Islamic schools that displayed notable anarchic tendencies were noted to have emerged in Iran following the Muslim conquest in the 7th century. During the Second Fitna, an extremist sect of Kharijites known as the Azariqa held control of Southern Iran until their defeat by the Umayyad Caliphate. A rationalist sect of Islam with notable anarchic tendencies was the Muʿtazila, who denied the necessity of the Imamate like their Kharijite contemporaries. They rose to prominence under the Abbasid Caliphate, particularly during the Mihna period instituted by the Caliph Al-Ma'mun, but following the rise of Al-Mutawakkil they fell under religious persecution. Many Muʿtazilites found refuge in Northern Iran during the reign of the Alid dynasties, which officially followed a form of Shia Islam known as Zaidiyyah, also persecuted by the Abbasids.

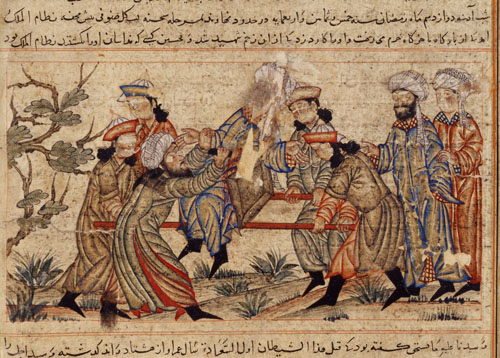
Assassination of Nizam al-Mulk, vizier of the Seljuk Empire, by an Assassin

The rise of Shia Islam in Iran saw the development of anarchic tendencies within branches of Isma'ilism, such as the Qarmatians who were noted for their communist practices, and the Nizaris, who established a stronghold in Alamut from which they organised the Order of Assassins, posing a threat to the stability of the Seljuk Empire. The individualist anarchist tendencies of the Assassins were noted by the contemporary Muslim anarchist Peter Lamborn Wilson, writing on their abrogation of the law in Alamut that:

In a sense, anyone can be the Imam; in a sense, everyone already is the Imam [...] the idea of the Imam-of-one's-own-being implies the idea of self-rule, autarky: each human being a potential king, and human relations carried out as a mutuality of “free lords.” [...] To liberate everyday life [...] begins with the individual and spirals outward in love to embrace others.[...] “radical” (post-Qiyamat) Ismailism restores “sovereignty” to the individual, who thus becomes his/her own “authority.” Spirituality is not a master/slave relation—it is not an “Oriental despotism.” Not any more. Not now. Maybe it never was.

By the beginning of the 13th century, an antinomian movement of Sufi dervishes known as the Qalandariyya had gained popularity throughout Greater Iran, developing individualist anarchist tendencies that rejected societal norms and emphasised social deviance. The influence of anarchic tendencies persisted in Iran, evidenced by a 14th-century text that reiterated the earlier arguments of the Kharijites and Muʿtazilites against the necessity of the Imamate, drawing on the libertarian tribal traditions of the Bedouin. But the turn of the 17th century marked the beginning of a decline in minority religious sects in the country, as the reunification of Iran under the Safavid Empire in 1501 initiated a process of conversion, which resulted Twelver Shi’ism becoming the dominant religion in the country. Despite the suppression of Shia Islam during the reign of the subsequent Afsharid dynasty, the rise to power of the Qajar dynasty in 1789 reimposed Twelver Shi’ism as the country's official religion.

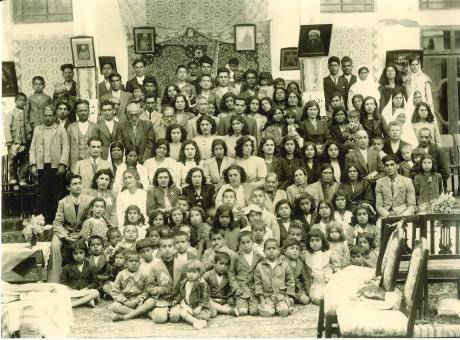
An Iranian Azali community

Shortly after the establishment of the Qajar Iran, Shaykh Ahmad founded Shaykhism, a mystical school of Twelver Shi’ism based around the promised coming of the Mahdi. Shaykh's successor Kazim Rashti taught his students how to recognize the Mahdi and, shortly before dying, sent his followers out to find them. In 1844, Sayyed ʻAlí Muḥammad Shírází took the title of the bāb and claimed to be the deputy of the Mahdi, founding the Bábi Faith. In the wake of a Bábi insurrection, a wave of persecution was unleashed by the Qajars, with the Báb and many of his followers being executed. Babists subsequently took up an underground struggle against the Qajar monarchy and the Shia clergy, with Qajar sources later coming to view Babism synonymously with anarchism, as one contemporary observer described: "Europe is in chaos. Anarchists, i.e., the enemies of despotic kings in every nation, are powerful across Europe. Domestically, and especially in Tehran, the Iranian anarchists, meaning Bábís, number around 50,000." A split in the Babi movement occurred in 1863, after Ḥusayn-ʻAlí Núrí claimed to be "He whom God shall make manifest" and founded the Baháʼí Faith, which a majority of Bábís gravitated towards, while the minority faction led by Subh-i-Azal rejected his claim. Despite Baháʼu'lláh's renunciation of anti-Qajarism and condemning violence against the government, Naser al-Din Shah Qajar remained suspicious of the Baháʼís and made no distinction between them and more radical Azalis, who had continued to oppose the state and clergy, and even practiced Taqiya - which Baháʼís rejected. Towards the end of the 19th-century, anyone inclined towards anti-statism or anti-clericalism was labelled as a Babi, leading Babism to become the most prominent dissenting voice within the Qajar Empire, out of which many oppositional tendencies began to emerge. The ideas of Babists such as Mirza Aqa Khan Kermani and Sheikh Ahmad Rouhi went on to influence the development of secularism, constitutionalism, nationalism, libertarianism and socialism in Iran.

=== Constitutional Revolution ===
During the reign of Naser al-Din Shah Qajar, radical left-wing ideas had already begun to spread through the Caucasus and into Northern Iran, with many northern workers beginning to develop class consciousness. Among the new political ideologies introduced to the country was anarchism, which surfaced throughout Iran towards the end of the 19th century, taking a particularly strong hold in Gilan Province. In the Gilani capital of Rasht, the Armenian anarchist Alexander Atabekian published his journal Commune from 1896 and later a group of Iranian anarchists held demonstrations to protest the execution of the Catalan anarchist pedagogue Francesc Ferrer i Guàrdia. A group particularly noted for their reception of political radicalism were Iranian Azerbaijanis, one of whom was the young Ehsanollah Khan Dustdar, who himself had become an anarchist while studying in Paris.

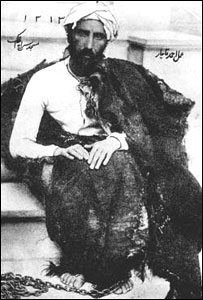
Mirza Reza Kermani, the assassin of Naser al-Din Shah Qajar

Rising anti-authoritarian sentiments in the country had given way to a sustained period of revolt against the absolutist rule of the Qajars, with the most notable example being the protest movement against the concession of tobacco to the United Kingdom. The assassination of Naser al-Din by Mirza Reza Kermani lay the groundwork for political change in Iran, culminating in 1906 with the outbreak of the Constitutional Revolution, which transformed the Sublime State of Iran into a constitutional monarchy.

The relative liberalism of Mozaffar ad-Din Shah Qajar had led to the rise of a prominent constitutionalist opposition among the middle class and the intelligentsia, including the revolutionary socialists of the Social Democratic Party and Secret Center, the utopian socialists of the Society of Humanity, the radicals of the Revolutionary Committee and the Islamists of the Secret Society. Following an economic crisis, a wave of protests broke out against the government, culminating in a general strike that finally forced the government to draft a constitution and convene a democratically elected National Consultative Assembly. Meanwhile, the escalation of the movement had brought about the formation of regional assemblies that acted as a form of dual power in opposition to the existing provincial governments and constitutional societies which freely published their own radical newspapers in Tehran. But the coronation of Mohammad Ali Shah Qajar in 1907 marked the beginning of a struggle between absolute monarchy and constitutionalism, as attempts by the new Shah to prevent the final ratification of the constitution led to another general strike, the assassination of Mirza Ali Asghar Khan Amin al-Soltan and widespread public riots, securing the victory of the Constitutional Revolution. Hasan Arsanjani later commented on the uniqueness of the Constitutional Revolution for its time, due to its successful combination of peaceful demonstrations, mass meetings and general strikes, comparing it to the anarchist theory of insurrection.

As liberals attempted to push more reforms through the Assembly, extra-parliamentary radicals organized a campaign for secularism, with radical newspapers publishing articles containing anti-clericalism for the first time in Iranian history. The journal Habl al-Matin criticised the new constitutional order for its collaboration with the clerics, who they blamed for the general decline of the Middle East. The women's rights movement also constituted itself at this time, establishing girls' schools and women's societies to push for gender equality. Frightened by the rise of secularism and radicalism, many reactionaries began recruiting followers in opposition to the Majlis. At a meeting of conservatives, Sheikh Fazlollah Noori blamed the post-revolutionary instability of Iranian society on the "atheist Armenian" Mirza Malkam Khan and declared that the liberals of the Majles were "paving the way for socialism, anarchism, and nihilism". Supported by the Russian and British Empires, the newly crowned Mohammad Ali Shah Qajar commanded the Persian Cossack Brigade to bombard the National Consultative Assembly, restoring absolutist rule over Iran.

Armed constitutionalist uprisings broke out throughout the country, with the Society of Guilds organizing a general strike and a number of provincial governments declaring their autonomy. Revolutionary socialists of the Secret Center, working together with Armenian intellectuals and Azeri social-democrats, began to build an independent "proletarian organization" that received hundreds of armed volunteers from the Caucasus, led by Sattar Khan and Baqir Khan. Civil war split the city of Tabriz along class lines, with Ahmad Kasravi observing that: "the sans~culottes and the propertyless poor reared their heads. The driving force of these men was toward anarchy. First to overthrow the despotic power of the court, then to turn against the rich and the propertied classes." Though the constitutionalists were victorious in Tabriz, they discovered that the city's lower classes had largely sided with the clergy against the revolution.

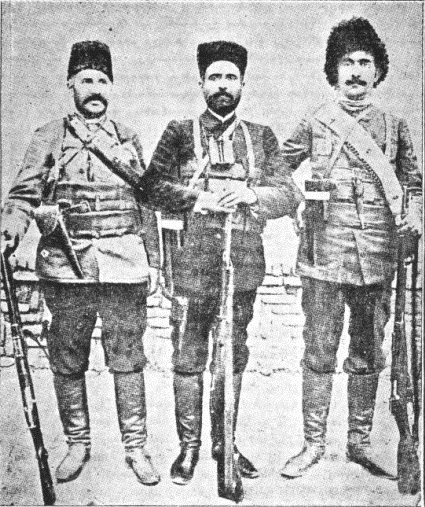
Keri, Yeprem Khan and Khetcho, during the constitutional revolution

Leading a coalition of Social Democrats, Social Revolutionaries and the Dashnaks, Yeprem Khan managed to capture the city of Rasht and raised the red flag over the city, before going on to lead a guerrilla assault against Tehran. In Mashad, Azeri radicals overthrew the local royalist authorities and proclaimed the first socialist program in Iran: calling for the armed defense of the constitution and numerous social reforms. The constitutionalists soon won the civil war and forced the Shah into exile, replacing him with his son Ahmad Shah Qajar and re-establishing constitutionalist rule by the Majlis.

The two most prominent political parties to emerge from the Revolution were the right-wing Moderates and left-wing Democrats, who condemned each other as reactionaries and anarchists respectively. The Democrat Party brought together survivors from a number of the pre-revolutionary radical societies, mostly from the Northern provinces. The extra-parliamentary Democrats were led by Haydar Khan Amo-oghli, who established trade unions and headed a workers' militia, while Mahammad Amin Rasulzade edited the party's newspaper, which propagated Marxism for the first time in Iranian history. The Democrats declared themselves in opposition to both domestic feudalism and foreign capitalism, and called for a number of far-reaching reforms to the constitutional state. They also argued in favor of centralization and nationalism as a counter-balance to Anglo-Russian imperialism and the Shahist autocracy, in a program that brought them into an alliance with the Armenian Dashnaks and the Russian Bolsheviks.

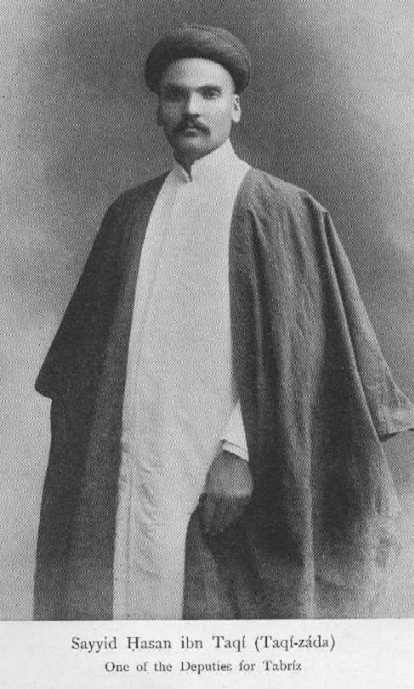
Hassan Taqizadeh, the assassin of Seyyed Abdollah Behbahani

The Democrats' proposed reforms drew a sharp opposition from the Moderates who, after taking power in 1909, called for the defense of society against "the terrorism of the anarchists, the atheism of the Democrats, and the materialism of the Marxists." The policy of secularism particularly divided the two parties, culminating in the assassination of the cleric Seyyed Abdollah Behbahani by the democrat Hassan Taqizadeh, with the government subsequently ordering the disarmament of the general public. When series of tribal revolts broke out amongst the country's ethnic minority populations, the Russian Empire took the opportunity to occupy the cities of Enzeli and Rasht, demanding a number of concessions under threat of Tehran being occupied. This resulted in the dissolution of the 2nd Majlis and a wave of mass protests and riots breaking out against the Anglo-Russian occupation, which were ultimately unsuccessful. With its leaders in exile, the radical movement largely dissolved, with only the Dashnaks and Armenian volunteer police officers providing continuity for the left-wing constitutionalist movement.

During World War I, the Moderates and Democrats constituted the 3rd Iranian Majlis in Qum, where it came into conflict with the Russian Empire. Ehsanollah Khan and Abolqasem Lahouti took part in the fighting against the Russians in Qum, under the command of Mohammad Taqi Pessian. The government was forced to retreat to Kermanshah, where it was destroyed by the British Empire, forcing many of its members into exile. During his time in the emigrant government's armed forces, Ehsanollah Khan became convinced that reconciliation between the two factions was impossible. With the constitutional government dissolved, it was a guerrilla movement in the province of Gilan that became the leading force in the struggle against the Anglo-Russian occupation.

=== Social Revolution ===
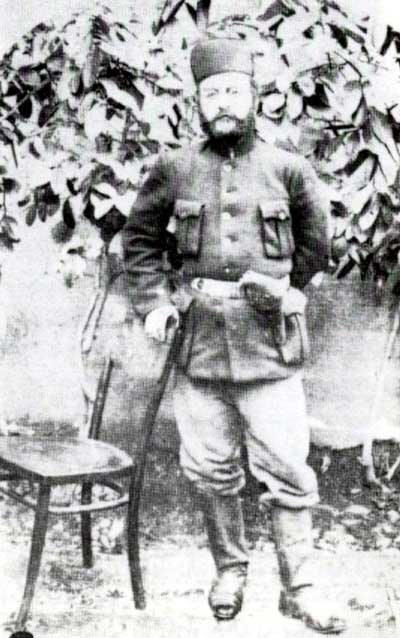
Ehsanollah Khan Dustdar, leader of the early Iranian anarchist movement

With the outbreak of the Jungle Movement in Gilan, the Azeri anarchist intellectual Ehsanollah Khan Dustdar led a detachment of leftist Democrats from Tehran to participate in the revolution. By the time that the Russian Revolution broke out, the Jungle Movement already controlled most of Gilan. Described by an English observer as "Robin Hoods of the Caspian Marches", they carried out expropriation of property from the rich and redistributed it to the poor.

Flag of the Persian Socialist Soviet Republic (PSSR)

By May 1920, the Persian Socialist Soviet Republic had been established by a united front of Jangalis led by Mirza Kuchik Khan, anarchists led by Ehsanollah Khan Dustdar and communists led by Haydar Khan Amo-oghli. Despite styling itself as a socialist republic, Kuchik's government was made up largely of conservative Islamists, which ordered its people to abide by religious tradition and attracted support from the province's merchant class.

By this point the anarchists and communists had begun to build dual power with the establishment of a "Revolutionary Committee", separate from Kuchik's Commissariat, with its power base in the Gilani Red Army - commanded by Ehsanollah. Tensions between the Jangalis and the communists began to heighten, as communists began to use armed force to collect taxes and introduced many foreign elements into the Gilani Red Army, alienating much of the province's population. Furthermore, the invasion of Gilan by the Russian Red Army exacerbated tensions with the central government in Tehran and led to the intervention of the British Empire, which supported a coup d'état against the government by Reza Khan's Persian Cossack Brigade.

Before long factional rivalries had broken out over a divergence between their vision for the Gilan revolution: Kuchik and the Jangalis were aiming for the spread of a nationalist and constitutionalist revolution, where Ehsanollah and the communists were agitating for a social revolution, reflecting the respective positions of the Moderates and Democrats, which these factions had originally emerged from. On July 31, 1920, the left-wing factions staged a coup, with Ehsanollah commanding the Red Army to overthrow the Commissariat government, forcing Kuchik to flee the capital of Rasht. The new "Red Cabinet", headed by Ehsanollah Khan and composed of leftist Jangalis, members of the Communist Party, anarchists and leftist democrats, implemented a system of "war communism" and instituted class warfare against capitalism and feudalism. During its time in power, Ehsanollah's government greatly reduced unemployment, implemented a wide-reaching education program and attempted to establish a national bank along mutualist lines. But the radicalism of the new government, combined with the lack of native Gilanis in official positions and its anti-religious campaign, heightened tensions between the government and the local population. Local clerics issued a fatwa against the government and land redistribution efforts were even rejected by the peasantry under religious grounds. The Gilani peasantry and middle classes, who largely supported a national revolution rather than a social revolution, became alienated from the new soviet government, leading to Kuchik Khan's armed resistance to the communist government receiving a considerable amount of support from native Gilanis.

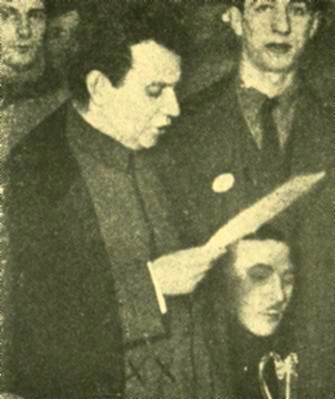
The keynote speech of the Congress of the Peoples of the East, being read by Grigory Zinoviev, a supporter of Ehsanollah Khan Dustdar

Members of the red government, including Ehsanollah Khan, attended the Congress of the Peoples of the East in September 1920, where Ehsanollah's anti-nationalist ideology of class warfare was supported by Grigory Zinoviev, who actively discouraged him from any future alliance with the middle classes. This led to a split within the Persian Communist Party, with Haydar Khan Amo-oghli seizing control of the party and expelling members sympathetic to Ehsnaollah's anarchist program such as Avetis Sultan-Zade, reorienting the party's policy towards cooperation with the middle classes in a national revolution to overthrow the monarchy and oust British interventionists. Haydar also proposed participation in parliamentary politics and even collaboration with the government of Reza Khan, which led Sultan-Zade to criticize Haydar's leadership as "national-reformist" lacking in any communist policy. Supported by Zinoviev, Sultan-Zade subsequently formed a left communist opposition to Haydar's Adalat faction, with the left communist faction being represented by Ja'far Pishevari at the Third Congress of the Communist International. On the other hand, Haydar's faction had the backing of Joseph Stalin, whose political program manifested itself within the Adalat Party.

With Haydar now moderating communist policy, Ehsanollah's government abandoned war communism and implemented a "New Economic Policy", which deemphasized class warfare and world revolution, relaxed government intervention in the economy and everyday life, and put an end to its anti-religious campaign. Haydar also mediated a truce with Kuchik Khan, who rejoined the soviet government in May 1921 as part of a reinvigorated united front. Sultan-Zade's left communist faction was excluded from the government and Ehsanollah was demoted to a minor role. By August 1921, Haydar's faction had entirely excluded anarchists and left communists from the Soviet government, dismissing Eshanollah from his governmental post and abandoning the remains of his radical program, culminating in Haydar re-proclaiming the Soviet Republic under his rule. Following his expulsion from the government, Ehsanollah led a force of 3,000 Gilani Red Army troops in a march on Tehran, but was routed by Fazlollah Zahedi, revealing a weakness within the Gilan Republic's revolutionary strength.

Internal tensions within the soviet government over land reform culminated with right-wing Jangalis staging a coup, assassinating Haydar Khan and destroying the headquarters of the Communist Party, and entering into negotiations with the central government. Meanwhile, Reza Khan's government had signed a "Treaty of Friendship" with Soviet Russia, negotiating the withdrawal of the Russian Red Army from Gilan in October 1921 and thereafter reasserting the central government's control over the province. Following the destruction of the Gilan Republic, an armed conflict broke out between right-wing forces led by Mirza Kuchik Khan and left-wing forces led by Ehsanollah Khan, ending in a leftist victory as Kuchik's forces fled into the Talesh mountains. Kuchik soon succumbed to frostbite and died in hiding, where Ehsanollah was eventually forced into exile in Baku. By 1925, Reza Khan had been proclaimed Shah by the Majlis, deposing the Qajars and establishing the rule of the Pahlavi dynasty over Iran.

In February 1927, Ehsanollah Khan travelled to Moscow where he met with other Iranian revolutionaries and began planning to create an underground revolutionary network, in order to agitate amongst the Iranian populace. He envisioned this as acting independently from the now-underground Communist Party of Persia and requested support from the Comintern Executive Committee, conditional on it not interfering in his activities. From Baku he coordinated the establishment of this network, led by his brother in Tehran, which began its clandestine activities. However, the Comintern reneged on its promised support following the ratification of a trade deal between Iran and the Soviet Union in October 1927. Following a subsequent congress held by the reactivated Communist Party, the Comintern resolved to cut ties with Ehsanollah Khan and dissolved his nascent revolutionary network. In 1928, after Ehsanollah Khan distributed a number of caricatures depicting Reza Shah as a puppet of the British Empire, communications between the Iranian and Azerbaijani governments resulted in the NKVD ordering him and his network to forever cease and desist their political activities. Ehsanollah Khan was later executed as an "enemy of the people" during the Great Purge. By 1930, in reaction to the revived activities of the Communist Party, Reza Shah ordered the passage of a national security law that outlawed the propagation of "collectivist ideology", which included socialism, communism and anarchism.

=== Resurgence of socialism ===
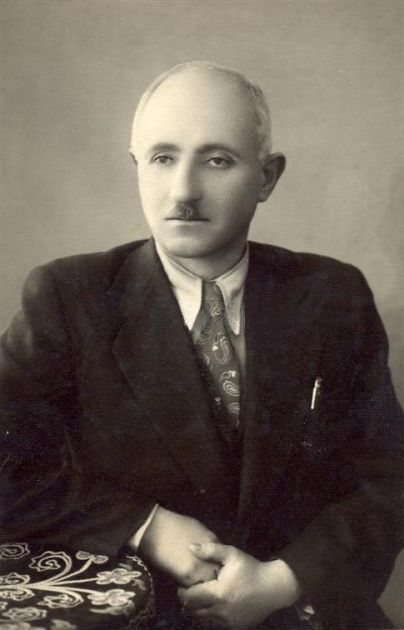
Ja'far Pishevari, leader of the Azerbaijan People's Government

Following the Anglo-Soviet invasion of Iran which forced the abdication and exile of Reza Shah, many of the country's political prisoners were released and left-wing political ideas began to flourish once again. When Ebrahim Hakimi came to power as Prime Minister, he resolved to both ease relations with the Soviet Union, while also instituting repressive policies against left-wing political movements. Hakimi banned public demonstrations, moved to outlaw the newly established communist party and refused to open dialogue with the "anarchists" that led the Azerbaijani Democratic Party (ADP). One of these so-called "anarchist leaders" of the ADP was the left communist Ja'far Pishevari, who had recently established a USSR-backed People's Government in Azerbaijan and had decades earlier participated in Ehsanollah Khan's soviet government in Gilan. By June 1946, Pishevari finally reached an agreement with the Central government, relinquishing Azerbaijani autonomy and going on to join the United Front of Progressive Parties, alongside the communist Tudeh Party, the socialist Iran Party and a number of other left-wing nationalist parties. In 1946, the United Front briefly became part of the coalition government established by Ahmad Qavam, but this was short lived. Following an insurrection by a number of Qashqai and Bakhtiari tribes against "communism, atheism, and anarchism", as well as sustained opposition by the military and pressure from Western powers, Mohammed Reza Shah swiftly ordered Qavam to form a different coalition without any left-wing political parties.

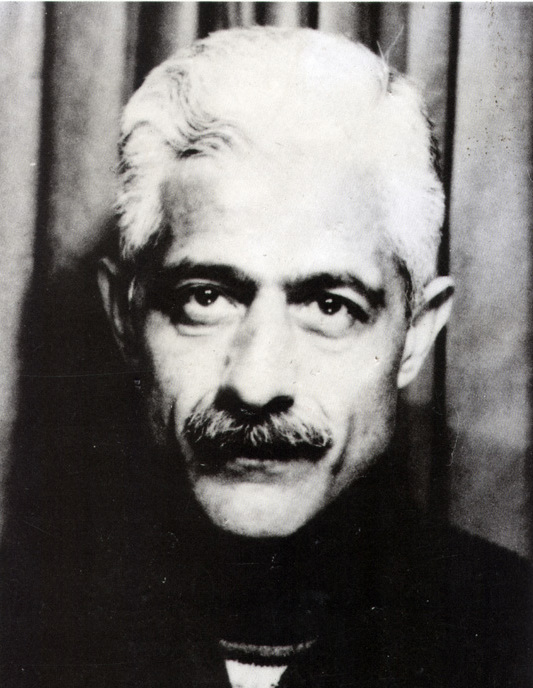
Jalal Al-e-Ahmad, founder of the Third Force and critic of what he called "Westoxification"

Tudeh subsequently entered into an internal feud over their policies of unconditional support for the Soviet Union and opposition to the national liberation struggles in Azerbaijan and Kurdistan, with Ehsan Tabari accusing critics of these policies of "negativism, cynicism, anarchism, intense individualism, and other character disorders prevalent in Iranian society", leading to a number of splits, expulsions and resignations. In 1948, Jalal Al-e-Ahmad founded the Third Force after breaking with the Tudeh Party, which he criticised for succumbing to "Westoxification", while exalting the National Front for accommodating religion into its platform, which he specifically credited for the Front's grassroots support. Due to Al-e-Ahmad's gradual recognition that religion could have a revolutionary potential, his former ally Khalil Maleki told him "you have become an anarchist". According to Yadullah Shahibzadeh, Al-e-Ahmad's political philosophy "represented an anarchist conception of democracy".

The Iran Party went on to found the National Front coalition, together with Mohammad Mosaddegh, which was elected to the Majlis and led the effort to nationalize the Anglo-Persian Oil Company in 1951, eventually forming a minority government. The government was re-elected with popular support, but was later overthrown in a monarchist coup backed by the United States and United Kingdom. The Shah consolidated power and began to rule as an autocrat, suppressing the country's left-wing opposition with a newly established secret police known as the SAVAK. Eventually, the Shah declared that opposition to his regime was "limited to a handful of nihilists, anarchists and communists", as many left-wing political leaders had already fled the country.

In 1955, the socialist Rezazadeh Shafaq commented that "I thoroughly agree with Western observers who describe Iran as a nation of anarchistic individuals. In our country, everyone considers himself a leader, sets his own goals, goes his own way, and without compunction tramples over others."

=== Armed struggle ===
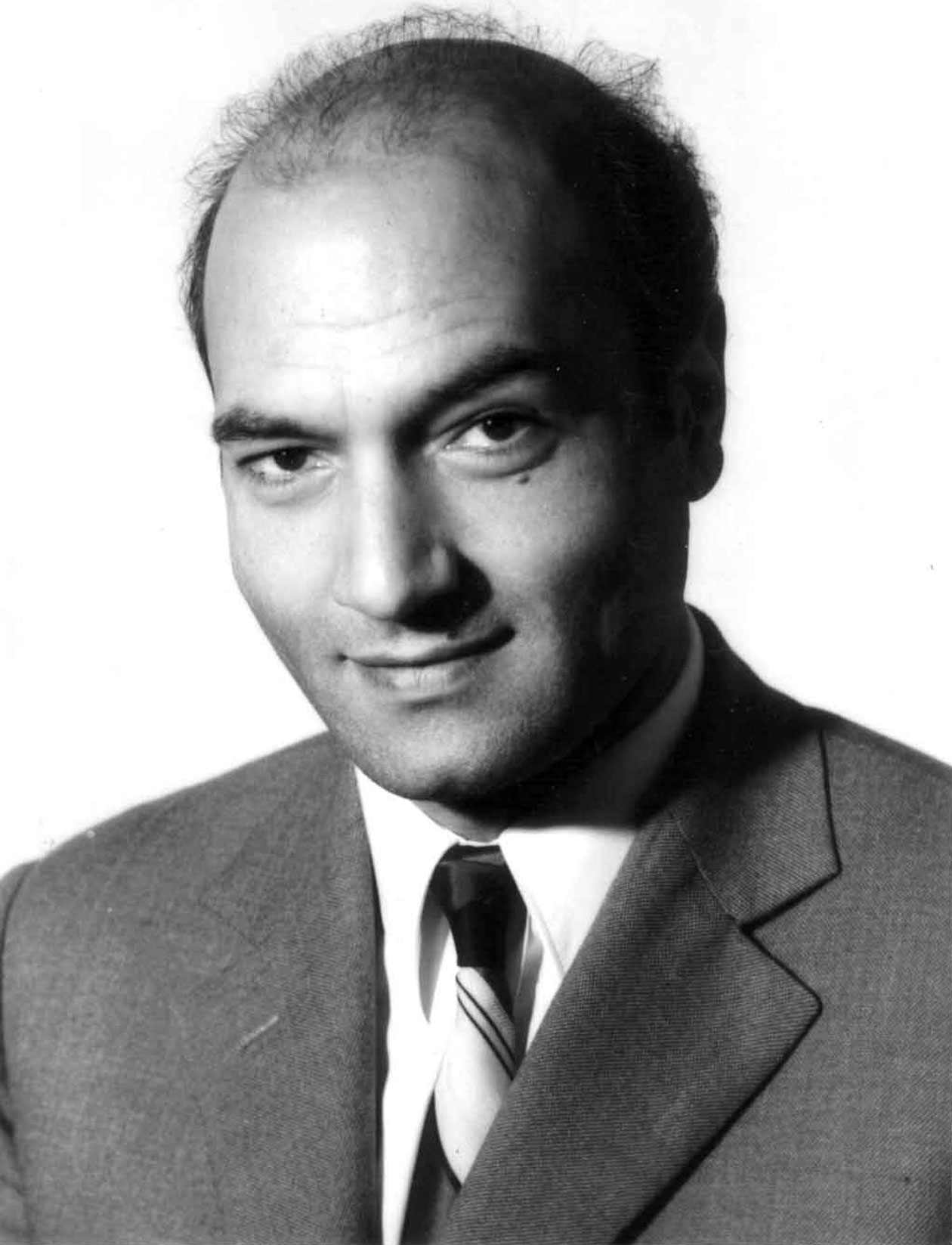
Ali Shariati, known for his revolutionary conception of Islamic socialism

Inspired by his teacher Louis Massignon, Ali Shariati constructed a revolutionary form of Islamic socialism that characterised Muhammad and Ali as fighters of a class war on the side of the proletariat, in a synthesis of Marxism and existentialism together with a militant form of Shia Islam. Following his imprisonment in 1964, Shariati developed a new-found appreciation for individual freedom, his conception of which stood in opposition to dictatorship, imperialism and exploitation. He believed in a form of "goal-oriented Islamic freedom" that could secure falah and argued that revolutionary education could liberate society from "ignorance and injustice". In his narrative poem Freedom, blessed Freedom, Ali Shariati wrote:

"O freedom, I despise governments, I despise bondage, I despise chains, I despise prisons, I despise governments, I despise dictation, I despise whatever and whomever enchains you."

According to Seyed Javad Miri, some scholars have argued that Ali Shariati was an anarchist, and Shariati's political philosophy has even gone on to inspire some sections of Islamic anarchism. Crucically his synthesis of Shia Islam with revolutionary socialism set the groundwork for the rise of a radical militant movement, with many Iranian socialists and communists dedicating themselves to armed struggle against the Shah, influenced in part by the Maoist concept of people's war and the advocacy of insurrection by South American anarchists.

Following the Sino-Soviet split, the Tudeh Party had taken a pro-Soviet line and renounced violent revolutionary action, labelling it as essentially anarchist and contrary to Marxism-Leninism, claiming that the Iranian movement for armed struggle lacked a revolutionary class consciousness. In response, a number of Iranian communist students in Europe split from the party in order to pursue a policy of armed struggle against the Shah, founding the Revolutionary Organization of the Tudeh Party (ROTP) along Maoist lines. When the ROTP published a pamphlet claiming that “the revolution in Iran will only succeed through the violent approach and armed struggle”, Tudeh responded by accusing them of taking "a completely sectarian, left-wing and adventurist" stance, denouncing the ROTP's "petty-bourgeois revolutionariness" which Tudeh claimed "resembled anarchism". Many ROTP members that returned to Iran to undertake an armed struggle against the Shahist government were captured, tortured and killed. Others, including the leading ROTP figure Parviz Nikkhah, converted to monarchism while imprisoned, becoming outspoken advocates of the White Revolution and opponents of revolutionary armed struggle.

Flag of the People's Mujahedin Organization (MEK)

In the wake of the suppression of the June Uprising, former members of the Freedom Movement took part in the foundation of the People's Mojahedin Organization of Iran (MEK). The MEK's ideology drew inspiration from a number of different areas, including Shiite beliefs, Marxist theory and insurrectionary anarchist practice. Through the Spanish anarchist Abraham Guillén and the Brazilian communist Carlos Marighella, they adopted the Bakuninist revolutionary strategy of propaganda of the deed, which they synthesised with the Islamic concept of Istishhad.

Flag of the Organization of Iranian People's Fedai Guerrillas (OIPFG)

In 1971, a Marxist group known as the Organization of Iranian People's Fedai Guerrillas (OIPFG) was established in Tehran, where it carried out a number of political assassinations against Shahist officials throughout the 1970s. The Tudeh Party claimed that the Fedai Guerrillas had more in common with the insurrectionary anarchism of Mikhail Bakunin and Johann Most, which advocated for individual propaganda of the deed as opposed to an armed struggle conducted by a disciplined political party only under the correct material conditions. From his exile in Bulgaria, Farajollah Mizani wrote the pamphlet What Are the People's Guerrillas Saying?, in which he defended the legitimacy of the Tudeh Party as the revolutionary vanguard and denounced those that proposed armed struggle as "the worst kind of anarchists", inspired more by the insurrectionary anarchism of Bakunin than classical Marxism-Leninism. According to Mizani, the armed struggle theories that were proposed by the ultra-leftists were "devastating Maoist" and "anti-Marxist-Leninist" theories of "terrorism and anarchism". By 1976, the minority faction of the Fedai aligned with the Tudeh against armed struggle, themselves denouncing propaganda of the deed, considering it to be an "aberration of Marxism". Meanwhile, a Maoist splinter of the Fedai eventually developed anarcho-communist tendencies, with a number of anarchists splitting off to establish an organization known as The Scream of The People (CHK).

Popular unrest against the Shah's government culminated in 1978, with the outbreak of the Iranian Revolution. Workers' councils known as shuras were formed all over the country, and took over the management of factories, offices, universities and even hospitals. Peasants revolted and seized the lands they worked on, while industrial workers in the oil industry went on strike, which brought the national economy to a standstill. During the course of the revolution, the Workers' Liberation Group (WLG), an Iraqi anarcho-communist organization, illegally crossed into Iran in order to help the CHK support the shura movement, while a number of anarchist "opposition combat groups" formed in order to wage guerrilla warfare against the Shah's government.

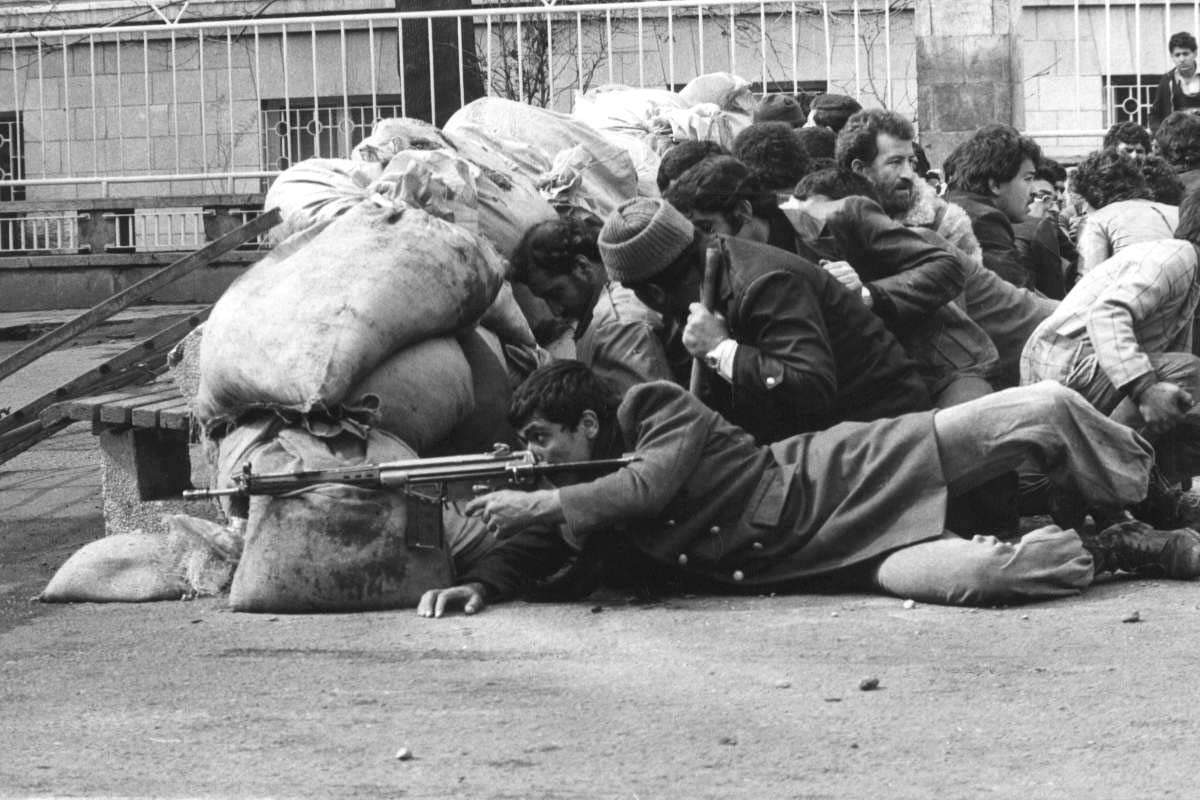
Armed insurgents fighting during the Iranian Revolution

By January 1979, the Shah had fled to country and guerrilla organizations such as the MEK and OIPFG had launched an insurrection against the state, taking over key centres of military infrastructure. The shuras quickly became the basis of the new Iranian society, setting up agricultural collectives and self-managed enterprises, establishing neighborhood assemblies and even arming the population. Over a million people participated in the May Day demonstration of that year in Tehran and the headquarters of the state-controlled trade union federation was occupied by workers, who established the Workers' House in its place and called for every factory in Iran to form their own shuras. The South African anarchist Michael Schmidt described this period as "a true workers' revolution with secular revolutionaries and Muslim workers overthrowing the capitalist state side by side."

But before long, fundamentalist clerics around Ruhollah Khomeini started to consolidate power by ordering the end to strikes and declaring the shuras to be "counter-revolutionary". The interim government passed a law that banned workers' self-management through the shuras and undertook a liquidation of the workers' movement, replacing them with state-controlled institutions designed to rebuild capitalism in Iran. The Islamic Republican Party was founded to take control of the government away from opposition parties, the Islamic Revolutionary Guard Corps was mobilized to dissolve the shuras, repress Kurdish separatism and attack the women's rights movement, and Hezbollah was established to break up the continuing strike actions. By the end of 1979, any remaining opposition had been suppressed and the Islamic Republic of Iran was constituted as a theocratic state. The anarchists of the CHK and the WLG were both targeted in the suppression, with many of their members being killed and their organizations forcibly dissolved.

=== Contemporary resurgence ===
Following the revolution, the OIPFG had split up into a number of different factions: when the majority reformed as a political party, abandoning armed struggle and eventually leaving behind its communist views altogether, the Iranian People's Fedai Guerrillas (IPFG) led by Ashraf Dehghani broke away and continued to engage in guerrilla warfare, fighting in the Kurdish rebellion alongside a number of Kurdish parties including the Kurdistan Workers' Party (PKK), before its suppression in 1983. After many of its members were forced into exile in Europe, the IPFG came into conflict with a number of Khomeinists in the diaspora. Some of the IPFG's exiled members began to move away from its organizational principles and re-examine the defeat of the Iranian left-wing movement, gravitating towards libertarian socialist schools of thought. One of these members, Payman Piedar, came across anarchism while in New York during the early 1990s and began to collaborate in a Persian-language libertarian Marxist journal Ghiam (English: Insurrection), which brought an end to his affiliation with Leninism. Piedar and a number of his collaborators went on to found Nakhdar (English: Neither God, Nor state, Nor bosses"), a specifically anarcho-communist magazine in both Persian and English that developed a readership among the Iranian diaspora, with some of its issues being smuggled into Iran. By the turn of the 21st century, anarcho-syndicalism was also being propagated by Iranian exiles, including the former MEK (marxist-leninist) supporter Hasse-Nima Golkar who joined the Central Organisation of the Workers of Sweden (SAC) in 2008, and it was later reported that anarcho-syndicalism had become the dominant anarchist tendency within Iran itself.

The process of anarchist ideas once again beginning to take hold within Iran and the Iranian diaspora eventually culminating with the establishment of the Anarchist Union of Afghanistan and Iran in May 2018, which resulted from the collaboration of the Afghan Aleyh group and the Iranian Radical Anarchist Front. Pulling mostly from a membership within Afghanistan and Iran, they declared themselves open to all anarchist tendencies, with the exception of anarcho-pacifism, religious anarchism and anarcho-capitalism. The Union has since organized support for anarchist political prisoners in Iran, including Soheil Arabi. Members of the Union also participated in the 2017–2018 Iranian protests, which they noted were organized without any central leadership, and issued a statement declaring its willingness to cooperate with armed groups in Kurdistan, Baluchestan and Khuzestan. They also claimed there was a "serious and widespread anarchist participation" in the 2019–2020 Iranian protests.

== See also ==
- List of anarchist movements by region
- Anarchism in Azerbaijan

== Bibliography ==
- Abrahamian, Ervand (1982). Iran: Between Two Revolutions. Princeton, New Jersey: Princeton University Press. ISBN 069100790X. OCLC 251638189.
- Abrahamian, Ervand (1989). The Iranian Mojahedin. New Haven: Yale University Press. ISBN 0300044232. OCLC 925091392.
- Amanat, Abbas (2012). "The Historical Roots of the Persecution of Babis and Baha'is in Iran". In Parviz Brookshaw, Dominic; Fazel, Seena B. (eds.). The Baha'is of Iran: Socio-Historical Studies. Florence: Taylor & Francis. ISBN 978-1134250011. OCLC 1027496514.
- Atabaki, Touraj (2013). "The Comintern, the Soviet Union and labour militancy in interwar Iran". In Cronin, Stephanie (ed.). Iranian-Russian Encounters: Empires and Revolutions Since 1800. New York: Routledge. OCLC 1257352452.
- Byrd, Dustin J.; Miri, Sayed Javad (2017). Ali Shariati and the Future of Social Theory: Religion, Revolution, and the Role of the Intellectual. Studies in Critical Social Sciences. Leiden: Brill. ISBN 978-9004353732. OCLC 1053531897.
- Crone, Patricia (1991). "Kavad's Heresy and Mazdak's Revolt" (PDF). Iran: Journal of the British Institute of Persian Studies. 29: 21–40. doi:10.2307/4299846. ISSN 0578-6967. JSTOR 4299846. OCLC 5543699603. Archived from the original (PDF) on 2019-11-02.
- Crone, Patricia (May 2000). "Ninth-Century Muslim Anarchists". Past & Present (167). Oxford: Oxford University Press: 3–28. doi:10.1093/past/167.1.3. ISSN 0031-2746. JSTOR 651252. LCCN 65077388. OCLC 4639911110.
- Dabashi, Hamid (2017). Theology of Discontent: The Ideological Foundation of the Islamic Revolution in Iran. London: Routledge. ISBN 978-1351472357. OCLC 997425699.
- Deutschmann, Moritz (2015). Iran and Russian Imperialism: The Ideal Anarchists, 1800-1914. London: Routledge. ISBN 978-1317385301. OCLC 945764907.
- Fiscella, Anthony T. (2009). "12. Imagining an Islamic Anarchism: A New Field of Study is Ploughed". In Christoyannopoulos, Alexandre J. M. E. (ed.). Religious Anarchism: New Perspectives. Cambridge Scholars Publishing. ISBN 978-1443815031. OCLC 667050168.
- Ghods, M. Reza (1989). Iran in the Twentieth Century: A Political History. Boulder: Lynne Rienner Publishers. p. 20. ISBN 0744900239. OCLC 473000977.
- Karamustafa, Ahmet T. (1994). "III. Renunciation, Deviant Individualism, and Sufism". God's Unruly Friends: Dervish Groups in the Islamic Middle Period 1200-1550. Salt Lake City: University of Utah Press. ISBN 0874804566. OCLC 43476590.
- Knight, Michael Muhammad (2012). William S. Burroughs vs. The Qur'an. New York: Soft Skull Press. ISBN 978-1593764760. OCLC 792687937.
- Marshall, Peter H. (1993). Demanding the Impossible: A History of Anarchism. London: Fontana. ISBN 978-0-00-686245-1. OCLC 1042028128.
- Matin-Asgari, Afshin (2018). Both Eastern and Western: An Intellectual History of Iranian Modernity. Cambridge: Cambridge University Press. ISBN 978-1108428538. OCLC 1051454142.
- Melis, Rachel (2009). "Anarchism, Iran". In Ness, Immanuel (ed.). The International Encyclopedia of Revolution and Protest. Malden, Massachusetts: Wiley-Blackwell. pp. 1–2. doi:10.1002/9781405198073.wbierp1660. ISBN 9781405198073. OCLC 8682032907.
- Piedar, Payman (2005). "Interview with an Iranian Anarchist". The Northeastern Anarchist (10). Morgantown, West Virginia: Northeastern Federation of Anarcho-Communists. ISSN 1553-3654. OCLC 47639698.
- Rahnema, Ali (1994). "9. Ali Shariati: Teacher, Preacher, Rebel". In Rahnema, Ali (ed.). Pioneers of Islamic Revival. London: Palgrave Macmillan. ISBN 1856492540. OCLC 1158887402.
- Rahnema, Ali (2020). Call to Arms: Iran's Marxist Revolutionaries. London: Oneworld Publications. ISBN 9781786079862. OCLC 1230150768.
- Schmidt, Michael (March 2002). "Religious Fundamentalist Regimes: A Lesson from the Iranian Revolution 1978-1979". Zabalaza (2). Bikisha Media Collective: 9–10. OCLC 67613414.
- Schmidt, Michael (2013) [2012]. Cartography of Revolutionary Anarchism. Edinburgh: AK Press. ISBN 978-1849351386. OCLC 881111188.
- Schmidtke, Sabine (2017). "The People of Monotheism and Justice: Muʿtazilism in Islam and Judaism". The Institute Letter. Princeton, New Jersey: Institute for Advanced Study. OCLC 1056628029.
- Shahibzadeh, Yadullah (2015). The Iranian Political Language: From the Late Nineteenth Century to the Present. Springer. ISBN 978-1137536839. OCLC 991746393.
- Tulsiram (1981). The History of Communist Movement in Iran. Bhopal: Grafix. OCLC 9486137.
- Vahabzadeh, Peyman (28 March 2016) [7 December 2015]. "FADĀʾIĀN-E ḴALQ". In Yarshater, Ehsan (ed.). Encyclopædia Iranica. Brill. ISSN 2330-4804. OCLC 8700134581.
- Veneuse, Mohamaed Jean (2009). "11. To Be Condemned to a Clinic: The Birth of the Anarca-Islamic Clinic". In Christoyannopoulos, Alexandre J. M. E. (ed.). Religious Anarchism: New Perspectives. Newcastle upon Tyne: Cambridge Scholars Publishing. ISBN 978-1443815031. OCLC 667050168.
- Volodarsky, Mikhail (2014). The Soviet Union and Its Southern Neighbours: Iran and Afghanistan 1917-1933. Hoboken: Taylor & Francis. ISBN 978-1135195304. OCLC 879023360.
- Zabir, Sepehr (2012). Iran Since the Revolution (RLE Iran D). Hoboken: Taylor & Francis. ISBN 9780203831960. OCLC 7385647003.
