= Hossein Joudat =

Iranian writer and politician (1892–1990)

Hossein Judet حسین جودت
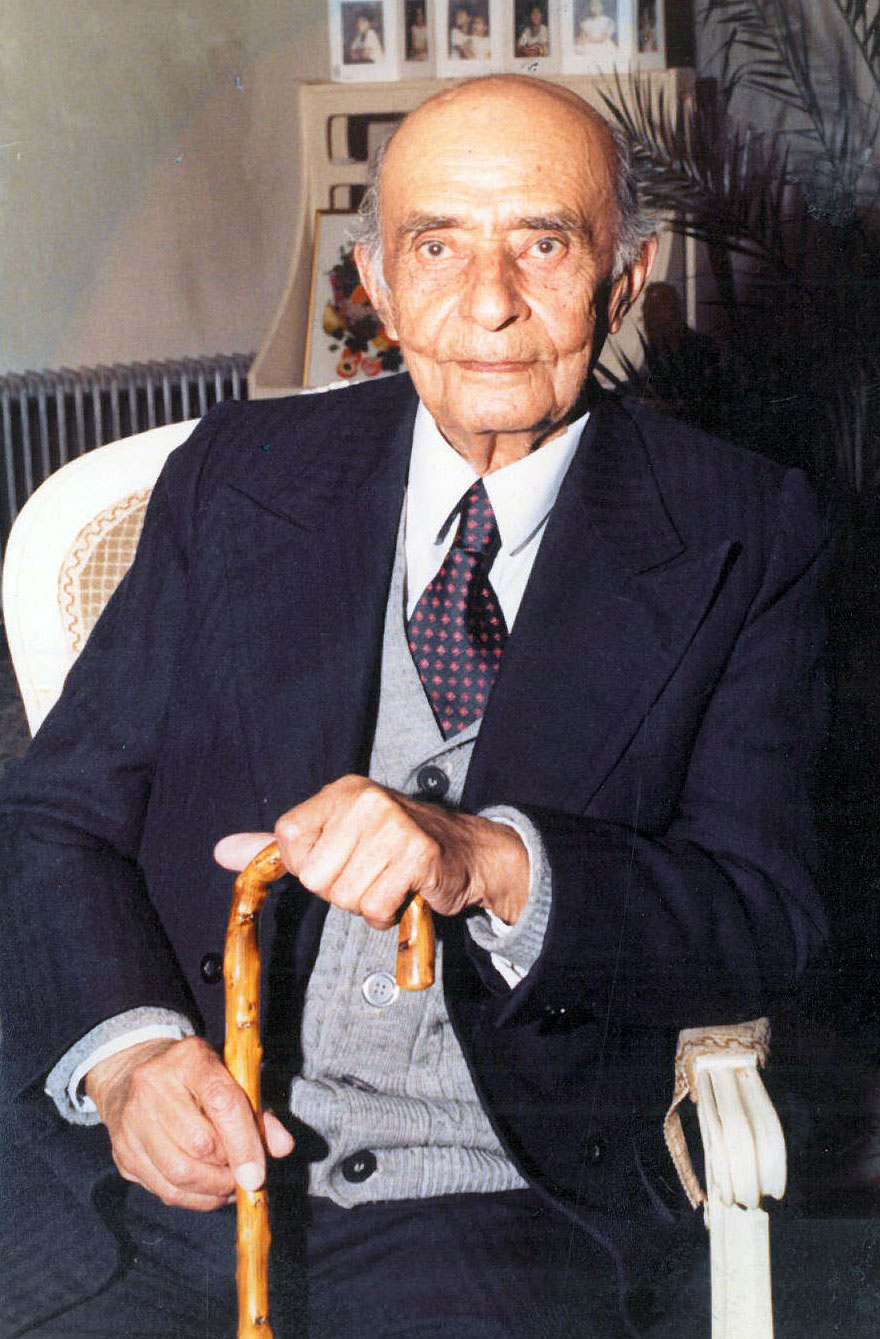
- Hossein Judet at the age of 93
- Born: 1892; Tehran, Sublime State of Iran
- Died: 2 February 1990 (aged 98); Tehran, Iran
- Other name: Mirza Hossein Khan Joudat
- Occupations: politician, teacher, journalist,
- Known for: Valuable cultural services

Hossein Joudat (Persian: حسین جودت; 1892 – 2 February 1990), also known as Mirza Hossein Khan Joudat, was a prominent modern Iranian cultural, political, media and literary figure.

Hossein Joudat was a dedicated cultural figure who made significant contributions to education, cultural development, and the establishment of the University of Tehran. His impact is still remembered, and various educational institutions and monuments bear his name in recognition of his services.

== Background ==
He completed his education at the Dar al-Fonun and had full command of Persian, Arabic, French, and English languages. He was born into a family where his father, Mirza Jafar Khan, held a position in the Nazem al-Saltaneh apparatus, overseeing the leadership of the guard house of the shah's special guard, a special guard unit for the shah (one of the most important positions in the court of Naser al-Din Shah Qajar), and the protection of the Qajar court.

Mirza Jafar Khan appointed Mirza Hossein Khan as the head of the Shah's Cavalry Guard (Qol Lar Aghasi) and entrusted him with the responsibility of supervising and overseeing the education of his children. Moqar al-Saltaneh, the elder son of Nazem al-Saltaneh, was among the intellectuals at the Shah's court and a follower of the thoughts and actions of Amir Kabir, advocating for reforms in the despotic system of the royal court. He took the initiative to prepare and write night letters against the court and delegated the critical task of reproducing and distributing these night letters, a very challenging task, to Mirza Jafar Khan.

Due to the repetition and distribution of the night letters, this action was discovered by the court's spies, leading to Moqar al-Saltaneh, the disgruntled son-in-law of the Shah, becoming a prisoner in the Qajar court. At the orders of Mirza Jafar Khan, the father of Mirza Hossein Khan Joudat, he was also imprisoned in the political prison of Qajar and subjected to imprisonment and chains. As a result of these actions, torture, and the prolonged duration of imprisonment, shortly after his release from prison, he bid farewell to life due to weakness and incapacity.

== Finding the way to Gilan ==
Following his graduation, Hossein Joudat, at the request of the educational authorities in Gilan, was selected as a mathematics teacher for the Ahmadieh School in Rasht. He participated in a competition among graduates of the Dar ul-Funun School in mathematics, where he successfully solved the problems and was introduced to Gilan's educational institutions. Jodat, in addition to teaching, founded the Cultural Society of Gilan in 1916 and remained active until 1931. He also played a role in the cultural and political activities of the region. In the Gilan Movement, he became the Commissioner of Education, succeeding in taking over the responsibilities from Sadegh Alam. According to Eisa Sadegh, Jodat, appointed as the head of education in Gilan, took charge of the administration and documents from Sadegh Alam.

== Comments on Hossein Joudat ==
Gregory Yeghikian writes about Hossein Joudat. Hossein Joudat, the responsible (minister) of culture (under the government of Mirza Kuchik Khan), was a young and well-mannered man dedicated to nurturing values. Rarely seen in his office, he would often work on official matters with the committee members until midnight, and frequently, due to the Revolutionary Committee's orders, he was on official trips. This person, who supervised Ferdowsi School, prioritized service to culture above all. However, his position and ministry were deprived of serving values for a few months based on the Revolutionary Committee's decision.

Joudat had a mother and a brother who, although could have lived in a luxurious mansion in the city, chose to stay in the modest house provided by the supervisor of Ferdowsi School. They regularly paid rent to the homeowner. Joudat refused to use his position and influence to move to a luxurious mansion like other Revolutionary Committee officials and employees, and he preferred not to have servants. He did not accumulate wealth for himself, served the revolution with utmost sincerity, took advantage of the general amnesty, submitted to the authority of the Reza Khan, went to Tehran, and resumed serving values in Tehran once again.

== Joining the army ==
Mirza Hossein Khan Joudat, despite his inclination to continue cultural activities, reluctantly joined the army due to the Reza Khan's request after the fall of the Jangal Movement. The decision was made to alleviate the concerns of Kurdish leaders. Joudat's involvement in the military played a crucial role in subsequent events, including the retreat from Miyandoab and the resolution of the fate of Kurdish leaders. Despite his reluctance, Joudat's mission in the military was initiated at the command of the army's behest. After approval, Joudat became a member of the war council and participated in suppression campaigns. Following Salar Zafar's death, Joudat remained in the army, and the fate of the Kurdish leaders marked the end of the Jungle Movement and with the end of the jungle movement, Joudat left the army.

== Cultural services ==
Mirza Hossein Khan Joudat, after leaving the army, returned to the cultural sphere and continued his cultural services, which had always been his longstanding aspiration. Initially appointed as the head of culture in Kerman and later in Lorestan, he actively contributed to the establishment of several schools and initiatives to improve the rights of teachers. His services in Kerman are extensively documented in valuable books, including those published by the retired educators' society and the cultural magazine of Kerman.

In recognition of his contributions, a school was named after Joudat, and he was later transferred to Tehran, where he continued his cultural endeavors. However, due to the overwhelming requests of the people of Kerman, he returned to serve as the head of culture until 1933. Subsequently, he was transferred back to Tehran, where he received a second-degree scientific award in 1934.

Joudat played a significant role in the establishment of the University of Tehran during his tenure at the Ministry of Education. He was actively involved in the construction of various buildings, including medical and dental faculties, under the supervision of Minister Ali Asghar Hekmat.

Additionally, Joudat took on roles in building construction and management within the Ministry of Culture and later the National Bank. He contributed to the construction of numerous educational centers and historical monuments. Joudat's dedication to the development of the University of Tehran, particularly in constructing the anatomy hall, is highlighted in his memoirs.

In summary, Mirza Hossein Khan Joudat was a dedicated cultural figure who made significant contributions to education, cultural development, and the establishment of the University of Tehran. His impact is still remembered, and various educational institutions and monuments bear his name in recognition of his services.
