= Heshmat Taleqani =

Iranian physician and revolutionary

Dr. Ebrahim Heshmat ol Atebba Talequani (also Dr. Heshmat-e Taleghani) (Persian: ابراهیم حشمت الاطبا طالقانی) was an Iranian physician and one of Mirza Kuchak Khan's closest friends and allies during the Jangal movement in the Gilan province of northern Iran. He served in many leading positions during the movement.

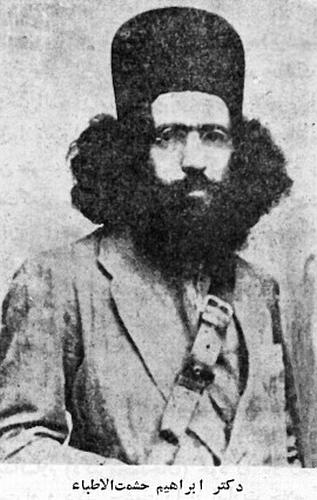
Ebrahim Heshmat

In the campaign against the movement initiated by Ahmad Shah's court in 1918–1919, the central government promised amnesty for the "Jangali" leaders who would surrender. Despite Mirza Kuchak Khan's advice, Dr. Heshmat surrendered. In the court he stated that he only wanted to oppose the British forces. The Qajar court reneged its earlier amnesty and condemned Dr. Heshmat to death by hanging. He was hanged in Ghoroghe Kargozari in Rasht on May 13, 1919. Dr. Heshmat himself put the rope around his neck and despite the audience's sympathy for his bravery, his life was not spared. The Jangal movement took off after this temporary defeat and resulted in the formation of the Persian Socialist Soviet Republic.

Dr. Heshmat was buried at "Chelleh Khaneh" cemetery in Rasht (Ref.). After 1979 his statue was erected at the modern day Farhang square in Rasht. Ebrahim Fakhrayi describes in detail a memorable ceremony at his tomb in May 1920 by Mirza Kuchak Khan who was victorious at the time and attended by many people in Rasht.
