= Mostafa Sho'aiyan =

Iranian Marxist theorist and activist

Mostafa Sho'aiyan (مصطفی شعاعیان; 1935 – February 1976) was an Iranian Marxist theorist, historian, and guerrilla activist. A largely self-taught intellectual, he became a notable figure on Iran's militant left during the 1960s and 1970s, developing an unorthodox revolutionary theory, centered on a concept he called "frontal politics," that broke with the Marxism-Leninism dominant among his contemporaries. He took his own life in 1976 to avoid arrest. Marginalized in his lifetime, his work has since drawn renewed scholarly attention, principally through the studies of the sociologist Peyman Vahabzadeh.

== Early life and political formation ==
Sho'aiyan was born in 1935 in a traditional neighborhood of Tehran. He came of age politically during the premiership of Mohammad Mosaddegh and the oil nationalization movement of the early 1950s. After a youthful attachment to Pan-Iranism, which he later recalled with sarcasm, he turned toward Marxism in the repression that followed the 1953 coup against Mosaddegh. After taking an engineering degree, he joined student and other activists during the brief political opening of 1960-1963; when repression resumed, he and many of his generation concluded that legal opposition had no future under the Shah, and he turned to urban armed struggle, spending the rest of the 1960s organizing and recruiting.

== Historical scholarship and break with Leninism ==
One of Sho'aiyan's most substantial works is an analysis of more than 500 pages of the Jangali movement (1915-1921), led by Mirza Kuchik Khan in the Caspian region, which culminated in the short-lived Gilan Republic. With limited access to archival sources, he argued that the movement's defeat owed not only to British intervention but, significantly, to the withdrawal of support by the young Bolshevik state. This conclusion distanced him from the era's near-mandatory Marxism-Leninism and led him to reconstruct his own revolutionary Marxism. Regarded as heretical, his break deepened his isolation on the Iranian left.

== Guerrilla activities and frontal politics ==
Following his break with Leninism, Sho'aiyan formed two militant groups, the first uniting Marxist and Muslim revolutionaries; both were broken up by security raids. He created an urban guerrilla cell in 1968; in 1972 it went underground after a foiled plan to sabotage the Isfahan steel plant at Lenjan. That year he and Nader Shayegan Shamasbi co-founded the People's Democratic Front (Jebheh-ye Demokratik-e Khalq), which advocated armed struggle against the Shah. In 1973, SAVAK raided the Front's explosives workshop, killing Shayegan and two others and arresting ten members; that June the survivors merged into the People's Fadai Guerrillas (PFG).

The People's Democratic Front embodied Sho'aiyan's theory of "frontal politics": his conviction that revolution should be pursued through a broad front uniting diverse anti-capitalist and anti-colonial tendencies rather than a single vanguard party, with its leadership left open as a democratic question. He credited the PFG with launching anti-colonial armed struggle in Iran, but came to regard it as sectarian and dogmatic, accusing it of using Stalinist methods to suppress internal dissent. Though it called itself a Marxist-Leninist party, he held that it functioned in practice as a front. He remained with the PFG from June 1973 until his March 1974 expulsion, then lived his final years underground.

== Revolutionary theory and underground scholarship ==
Sho'aiyan's principal theoretical work, Enqelab (Revolution; written 1973, published 1976, and originally titled Shuresh, "Rebellion"), is a treatise of some 320 pages outlining a synthesized theory of global liberation against capitalism and colonialism. Drawing on the anti-colonial movements of his time, from Vietnam and Algeria to Mozambique and Latin America, he recast "national liberation" as "international liberation," holding that the agent of revolution was not the proletariat alone but "the people" (khalq) across all nations; Vahabzadeh compares his position to Che Guevara's 1967 "Message to the Tricontinental". He held that Leninism neglected the working class, a failing he attributed to Lenin's thesis of "peaceful coexistence" with imperialism.

For Sho'aiyan the central task was popular mobilization, led by a revolutionary vanguard he called the "enlightener" (roshangar). In a 1972 debate with the Fadai theorist Hamid Momeni, he argued that the usual Persian word for intellectual, roshanfekr, was too ambiguous, and proposed roshangar for the educated vanguard that would form the core of a future popular movement, a notion Vahabzadeh likens to Antonio Gramsci's "organic intellectuals". Living clandestinely, he was a prolific underground scholar, producing more than 2,300 pages of analysis, history, memoir, and poetry and preparing new editions of earlier activists' works. His papers were entrusted to the historian Cosroe Chaqueri, who published major works of his through the Florence-based Edition Mazdak in the mid-1970s.

== Death and legacy ==
During a street search in Tehran on 5 February 1976, Sho'aiyan took his own life with a cyanide capsule rather than be captured. No leftist organization has associated itself with his thought, and he long remained an obscure figure. Later scholarship has reassessed him as a singular and significant thinker of the twentieth-century Iranian left and of Global South liberation theory.

== See also ==
- Bijan Jazani
- Iranian Revolution
