= Jangal (magazine) =

Ǧangal
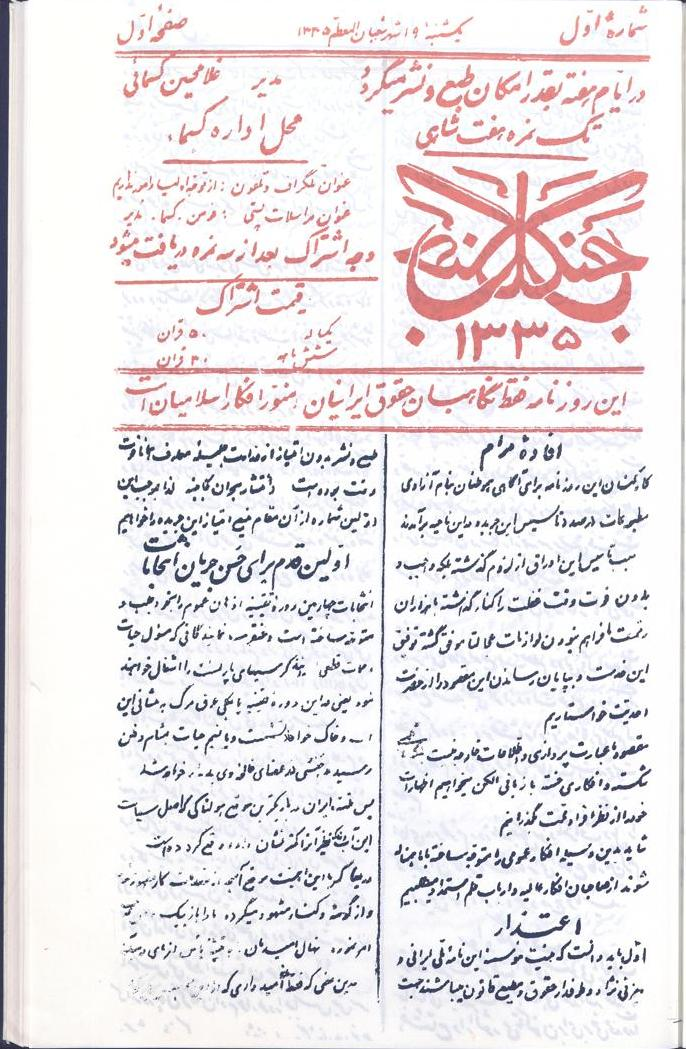
- Editor: Mirza Hoseyn Kasma’i
- Categories: Politics, literature
- Frequency: Every 5-11 days
- First issue: 9 June 1917
- Final issue: 28 May 1918
- Country: Iran
- Based in: Gilan
- Language: Persian
- Website: nbn-resolving.de/urn:nbn:de:hbz:5:1-74423%20Ǧangal

The periodical Jangal (Persian: جنگل, lit. 'Forest'; DMG: Ǧangal) was founded in 1917 by the Nehzat-e Jangal (“Jangali-movement“, 1914–1921) in Gilan, Iran. Mirza Kuchak Khan (1880/1882–December 1921), a young revolutionary and the founder and leader of this movement was fighting together with the Ettehad-e Eslam committee (“Islamic Unity“) in the forests of Northern Iran. Their movement was directed against – among others – large landowners as well as the exertion of influence coming from the British and Tsarist Russia. In June 1920, the Jangalis joined forces with the Communist Party of Iran and proclaimed the Socialist Republic of Gilan, which was re-conquered by Reza Khan Pahlavi (later: Reza Shah Pahlavi) in November 1921. The journal was the mouthpiece of the Jangalis and partially published by Mirza Hoseyn Kasma’i (1862–1921). They spread their opinion and critique in 31 issues by means of literary texts and cultural symbolism. They had many ideas in common with the nationalism of state elites: aspiring the compatibility of Islam, Iranian nationalism and socialism.
