= Jungle Party =

- Secretary: Ebrahim Rezazadeh Fakhraei
- Founded: Late 1941
- Dissolved: 1947
- Headquarters: Rasht, Gilan, Iran
- Ideology: Socialism; Left-wing nationalism
- Political position: Left-wing
- National affiliation: United Front of Progressive Parties

Party flag

The Jungle Party (Persian: حزب جنگل, romanized: Ḥezb-e Jangal; also translated Forest Party) was a secessionist party active in northern Iran during 1940s. The party was founded by armed rebels and some of Mirza Kuchik Khan's old associates who tried to revive the Persian Socialist Soviet Republic created in 1921 and used its red flag as a symbol. It allied with the Iran Party, Tudeh Party of Iran, Democratic Party of Iranian Kurdistan and Azerbaijani Democratic Party in 1946.

== See also ==
- Jungle Movement of Gilan
