= Gregory Yeghikian =

Gregory Yeghikian Գրիգոր Եղիկյան
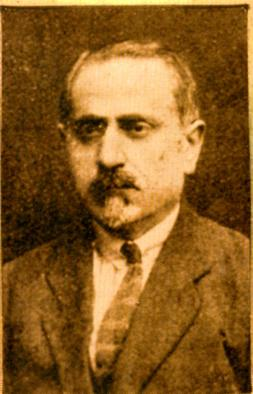
- Born: 1880; Sivas Vilayet, Ottoman Empire
- Died: 24 January 1951 (aged 70–71); Tehran, Pahlavi Iran
- Other names: Gregor Yeghikian, Grigor Yeghikian

Gregory Yeghikian, or Gregor Yeghikian (Armenian: Գրիգոր Եղիկյան, Persian: گریگور یقیکیان; 1880 – 24 January 1951) was an Ottoman Empire-born Armenian playwright, historian, and one of supporters of Pan-Iranist movement. He lived in Iran for many years.

== Life and career ==
Gregory Yeghikian was born in 1880, in the Sivas Vilayet, Ottoman Empire. He studied in Istanbul and because of pressures of Ottoman Empire, he left Istanbul and went to different countries.

In the beginning of the 20th century, he went to Iran and started to work as a principal in Gilan province. Then he was recruited by Kuchik Khan, Iranian revolutionary and started to work as translator for him in the Nehzat-e Jangal (Jungle Movement). After being involved in the political movement, Yeghikian went to Tehran and started to write plays. Critics believe that Yeghikian had two different types of plays, historical plays and social plays. For example, his plays Fight Between East and West, and Anooshiravan were his historical plays and Fear Square and Who is Guilty? were his social plays.

== Works ==
=== Plays ===
- Fight Between East and West
- Anooshiravan
- Fear Square
- Who is Guilty?
- It can be Late, but Sweet
- Grand Horsewoman

=== Historic works ===
- Soviet Union and the Jungle Movement

=== Iran-e Kabir ===
Iran-e Kabir (Persian: ایران کبیر, romanized: Irān-e Kabir, lit. "Greater Iran") was a periodical published in the city of Rasht by Yeghikian. It advocated the unification of Iranian peoples (e.g., Afghans, Kurds, etc.) including the Armenians. Yaqikiān believed that, with education and the rising of the levels of people's awareness, such a goal was feasible through peaceful means. The journal benefited from the contributions of a number of leading intellectuals of the time, including Moḥammad Moʿin and ʿAli Esfandiāri (Nimā Yušij), and carried articles, poetry, a serialized story, and some news. It also published articles in support of the Kurds who had risen in rebellion in Turkey, which caused the protest of the Turkish counsel in Rasht and led to the banning of the paper by the order of the minister of court. Yaqikiān tried, without success, to have the ban removed and eventually moved to Tehran, where he published the paper Irān-e Konuni.

== Sources ==
- Khalaj, Mansoor (1992). Iranian Playwrights. Tehran: Akhtaran. pp. 95–100. ISBN 964-7514-13-1.
- Parvin, Nassereddin (2006). "IRAN-E KABIR". Encyclopædia Iranica, Vol. XIII, Fasc. 5. p. 496.
- Nima, Bagheri; Maryam, Azizian; Razavi, Leyla Najafian (2019). "Gregory Yeghikian's Historiographical Method and Standpoint in the Soviet Union and Jangal (Jungle) Movement". Historical Perspective & Historiography. 29 (24): 13–41. doi:10.22051/hph.2020.27520.1378.
