= Treaty of Establishment, Commerce and Navigation =

1935 treaty between Iran and the Soviet Union

The Treaty of Establishment, Commerce and Navigation (or the Treaty of Establishment, Commerce and Navigation with Full Protocols and Annex) was signed on August 25, 1935, between representatives of Iran and the Soviet Union. This accord helped to reinforce the tenets of the Russo-Persian Treaty of Friendship. Based on the terms of the treaty, both signatories reinforced their respective rights to fly their national flags on their respective commercial vessels. Moreover, both signatories were allowed to fish in the Caspian Sea within ten nautical miles (19 km) of the coastline.

== See also ==
- List of treaties

== Sources ==
- Mehdiyoun, Kamyar. "Ownership of Oil and Gas Resources in the Caspian Sea." The American Journal of International Law. Vol. 94, No. 1 (January 2000), pp. 179–189.
