= Falah =

Arabic word for salvation

Falāḥ (فلاح) is the Arabic word for salvation (especially from self-improvement), happiness and well-being. In Islamic contexts, according to the Qur'an,(Muslim's book) actions such as conforming to Allah's commands, establishing the Zakat (charity tax), not taking intoxicants and not gambling all lead to falāḥ.

== See also ==
- soteriology
