= Jungle Movement of Gilan =

Iranian nationalist rebellion (1915–1921)

Jangali rebellion in Gilan
- Part of the Aftermath of the Persian Constitutional Revolution, the Aftermath of World War I, and the Revolutions of 1917–1923
- Map showing Gilan (in red), the region where the rebellion took place
Date	October 1915 – October 1921 (~6 years)
Location	Gilan, Iran
Result	Anti-Jangali victory: Annexation of the Persian SSR into Iran proper
Territorial changes	Brief secession of the Persian Soviet Socialist Republic from June 1920 to September 1921

Belligerents
Jangal Movement; Committee of Union of Islam (late 1917–August 1918) (surrendered); Bolshevik Committee (from 1919); Socialist Committee (1919–20); Socialist Party (from May 1920); Soviet Gilan (from June 1920); Gilaki Revolutionary Committee; Council of People's Commissars of Gilan; Supported by: Germany (until 1918); Austria-Hungary (until August 1918); Ottoman Empire (until August 1918) (Note: Mirza Kuchik Khan was not aligned with the Ottomans, but some Jangalis were. Some Ottoman actions, such as the Siege of Baku, undermined the Jangal movement. The latter formally cut ties with the Ottomans in August 1918, in an agreement with the British.); Anzali Revolutionary Committee (1918) (surrendered); Baku Commune (1918); Mughan Soviet Republic (1918-1919); Soviet Russia (1920–21); Communist Party of Persia (1920); Kurdish tribes; Co-belligerents: Kurdish rebels (from 1918); Azadistan (1920); Khorasan (1921)	Qajar Iran: Cossack Brigade; United Kingdom: Dunsterforce (1918); North Persia Force; Russian Empire (until 1917); White movement (1918)

Commanders and leaders
Mirza Kuchik Khan; Ehsanollah Khan Dustdar (1917–21); Heshmat Taleqani (1918–19) (surrendered) (executed); Ja'far Pishevari (1921); Supported by: Anton Cheliabin (1918) (surrendered); Stepan Shaumian (1918) (executed); Nariman Narimanov (1918); Kress von Kressenstein (1918); Bala Mamed Zuvandskiy; Fedor Raskolnikov (1920); Yakov Blumkin (1920); Sergo Ordzhonikidze (1920) "Budu" Mdivani; Nisar Muhammad Yousafzai (1920); Haydar Khan Amo-oghli (1920) X Karim Khan; Qanbar Khan; Khalu Khasmat; Babakhan	(Iran) Ahmad Shah Qajar (Russian Empire) Gen. Nikolai Baratov (1915) (Russian Empire) Col. Lazar Bicherakhov (1918) (British Empire) Maj. Gen. Lionel Dunsterville (1918) (Iran) Hassan Vosugh al-Dowleh (1918–20) (Iran) Hassan Pirnia (1920) (Russian Empire) (Iran) Col. Vsevolod Starosselsky (1918–20) (British Empire) FM Edmund Ironside (1920–21) (Iran) Brigadier Gen. Reza Khan Pahlavi (1920–21)

Strength
Jangali forces: 3,000-8,000 (1918); Red Guards of the Anzali Revkom: 1,000 (1918)	Persian Cossack Brigade: ~8,000; Bicherakov's forces: 1,200; Dunsterforce: 350; North Persia Force: 500 (1920)

The Jangal (Forest or Jungle) Movement (Persian: جنبش جنگل) was a rebellion against the monarchist central government of the Sublime State of Iran in Gilan, which lasted from 1915 to 1921.

== Conquest of Tehran ==
In July 1909, following the dissolution of the parliament during the reign of Mohammad Ali Shah Qajar and the 1908 bombardment of the Majlis, constitutionalist fighters from Gilan and the Bakhtiari tribe advanced toward the capital. With the capture of Tehran, alongside the Bakhtiari tribesmen, they reestablished the constitutional system in Iran. Sepahdar-e Azam Tonekaboni, the commander of the Gilani constitutionalists, was also appointed Prime Minister.

== History of the movement ==
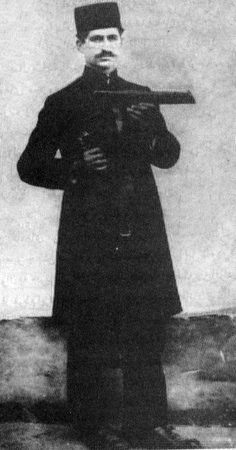
Mirza Kuchik Khan in the prelude to the Jangali rebellion

=== Origins and beliefs (1915) ===
In October 1915, Haj Ahmad Kasmai (1264 - 1344 Ghamari/1250 - 1330 Shamsi/1871 - 1951 AD), Kabra Ibrahim Kasmai, Hossein Kasmai (mentioned in Shivan Fumani's poem "Gaav"), Gholam Hossein Kasmai, Dr. Heshmat Taleghani, and Mirza Kuchik Khan, an experienced activist in the pro-democracy and nationalist Constitutional Revolution, among others, collectively launched the Jangal movement in the forests of Kasma, Gilan. They demanded autonomous status for the province, an end to central government corruption, an end to foreign interference in affairs of local peoples, and land reform. Basically, even though the movement was not "separatist", "bourgeois nationalist", or communist, its main ideas were rooted in ridding the country of government corruption, "foreign imperial domination," and opposition to the country's existing monarchy. With such goals, it is no surprise that the movement enjoyed strong support of the peasantry, working class, and poor population within Iran. Even so, Hooshang Amirahmadi describes the movement's leaders as "merchants and landlords" and Mirza as part of the "democratic wing" of the Iranian bourgeoisie.

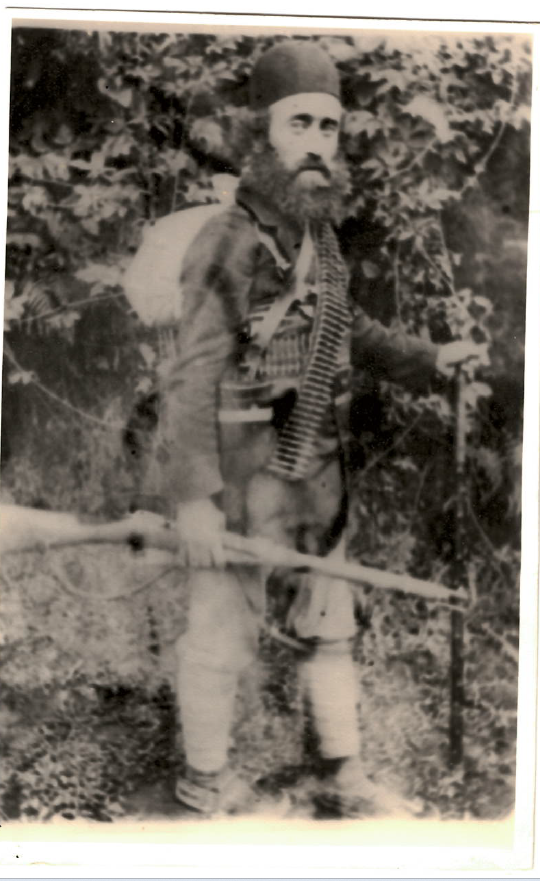
Kabra Ibrahim Kasmai, the brother of Haj Ahmad Kasmai, and one of the key figures of the Jangal Movement.

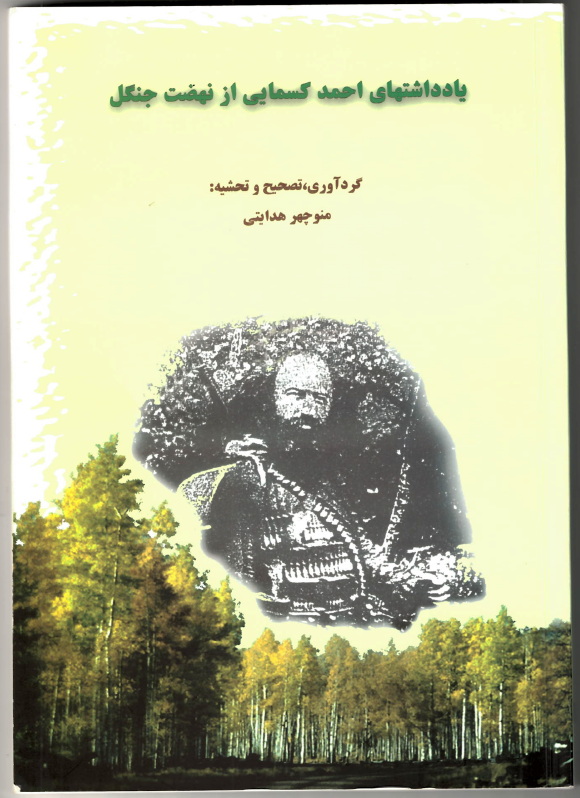
Front cover of Haj Ahmad Kasmai's book Yad Dashtaye Ahmad Kasmai az Nehzateh Jangal: Gardavari, Tas-hee, va Tashiye Manouchehr Hedayati (translation: Ahmad Kasmai's Notes from the Jungle Movement: Gathered, Edited, and Notated by Manouchehr Hedayati)

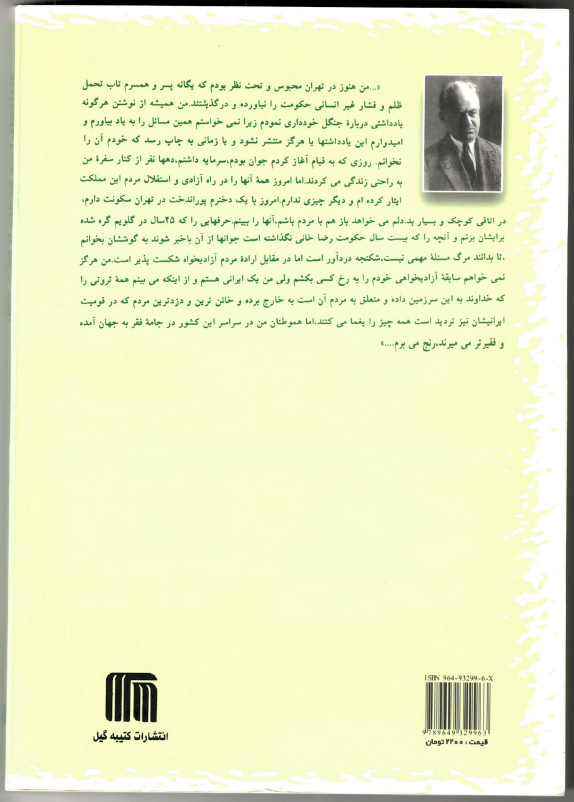
Back cover of Haj Ahmad Kasmai's book Yad Dashtaye Ahmad Kasmai az Nehzateh Jangal: Gardavari, Tas-hee, va Tashiye Manouchehr Hedayati (translation: Ahmad Kasmai's Notes from the Jungle Movement: Gathered, Edited, and Notated by Manouchehr Hedayati)

=== Early Jangal movement (1915–18) ===
In years that followed, the movement's guerrillas, Jangalis, fought against foreign invaders. They initially defeated the armies of two landowners, and a force consisting of 550 Russians and 50 Persian Cossacks. However, they were nearly destroyed in January 1916 by Nikolai Baratov's forces. Still, they managed to defend themselves and recovered, taking control of large amounts of territory in Gilan, even taxing Gilakis. While the Jangalis were described as "small landowners in Gilan" that advocated armed insurgency, they were strong enough to resist the advances of the Russian Empire, leading the British to become the major military presence in the region instead. After the Russian Revolution in 1917, Marxists within Iran became more organized and began collaborating with the Jangal movement, with many of these new revolutionaries directly influenced by the Bolsheviks. Later, these Marxists would end up forming the Tudeh Party. Even so, there were undoubtedly differences since Mirza supported land reforms but not land redistribution.

Near the end of 1917, the Jangalis organized the Committee of Union of Islam, since they were affiliated with the Union of Islam movement, which was "bourgeois-nationalist" with democratic elements, with members on the committee mainly comprising landlords and merchants. Still, they drew up a proposed constitution which accepted "private property in land" with certain limitations but also called for equality, majority rule, and freedom. Even with this, the Jangalis failed to change relations between landlords and peasants, but they did continue to hold an anti-absolutist, anti-imperialist, and nationalist position displayed in their magazine, Jangal, launched in 1917. In December, after the October Revolution in Russia, the Anzali Revolutionary Committee, made up of Bolsheviks and Socialist Revolutionaries and led by Anton Cheliabin, was created. However, the committee and its Red Guards did struggle to control Russian forces in the region, as many Russians opposed the Bolsheviks. In years that followed, it was clear that the Jangal movement was gaining strength as disorder and insecurity, such as the famine of 1917–19, swept the country.

The British did not take Mirza's successes lightly, and sent intelligence agent Edward Noel to assassinate Mirza. Noel was arrested before he could take any such action. Colonel Stokes and General Lionel Dunsterville (whose troops were informally referred to as Dunsterforce) were further agitated by Mirza's refusal to let British forces pass through Gilan on their way up north, while Mirza had approved and guaranteed safe passage for Russian troops returning north. British forces attacked Rasht as a result, and even bombed Mirza's residence using airplanes. An ultimatum was issued to Mirza by the British to surrender.

=== Battle of Manjil and temporary neutralization (1918) ===
In 1918, the British brought White Russian colonel Lazar Bicherakov and his 1,200 Cossacks under their command. According to Dunsterville, he intercepted a letter from "a big man in Tehran" to Mirza, which implicated Prime Minister Mostowfi ol-Mamalek, on 7 April. The Dunsterforce and the Russians under Bicherakov reached Qazvin by 10 April and from there tried to capture the Manjil bridge to crack down on the Jangalis, who sought support from the Baku Soviet Commune's leader Stepan Shaumian and Azerbaijani revolutionary Nariman Narimanov.

The Dashnaks in the Red Guard did not obey the Anzali Revolutionary Committee and instead had "infiltrated" the Jangal movement. Therefore, in the Battle of Manjil (14 April–12 June 1918) Bicherakov's and Dunsterville's forces decisively defeated the Jangalis, despite the fact that Bicherakov's troops and the Jangalis were cordial with one another, according to Dunsterville's diary entry for 17 April. Dunsterville carried out this operation to open the way to Baku in order to eliminate the Commune there with Dashnak assistance. The Baku Commune soon collapsed, as did the Anzali Revolutionary Committee and the Red Guards, who returned to Baku. The Jangalis soon made an agreement with British forces on 12 August, abandoned pan-Islamism and any pro-Ottoman sentiments, and dissolved the Committee of Union of Islam.

=== Resumption of hostilities and Gilan SSR (1918–20) ===
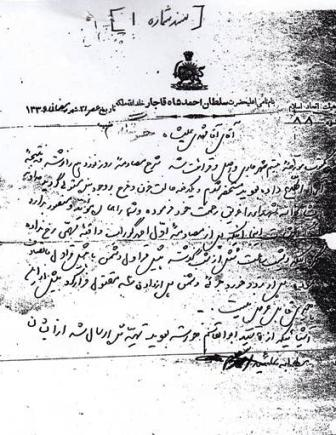
Document from Mirza Kuchik Khan to Mashhadi Ali Shah Houshangi

After this, Mirza Kuchik Khan went on an expedition to Talish and moderate Jangalis wished to negotiate with and surrender to the central government in Tehran. When Mirza returned and learned of this, he became once again opposed to the British, who already had plans to attack. This British campaign was supported by the Anglophilic government of Vosugh al-Dowleh. Anti-Jangali opposition became more organized in March 1919, when the British entered Rasht, the Gilaki capital. This was met with staunch support from local landlords and mullahs. Around this time, radical anti-theist communists like Ehsanollah Khan Dustdar formed the Bolshevik Committee, while non-Marxist Islamic socialists like Mirza formed the Socialist Committee, which eventually became the Socialist Party.

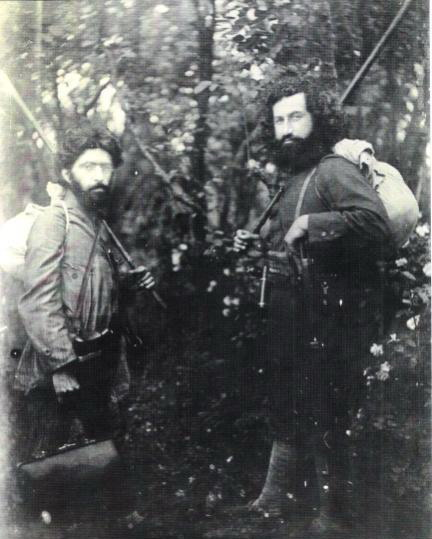
Mirza Kucik Khan and Dr. Heshmat

The Russians joined the British and sent in 20,000 troops to capture Mirza. Many prominent members of the movement such as Haj Ahmad Kasmai and Dr. Heshmat Taleqani surrendered, with 270 troops, and the latter was executed by the Qajar government despite the immunity that he was granted.

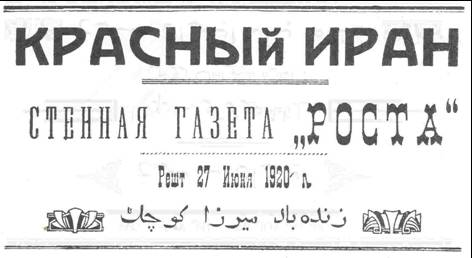
Red Iran: "Rosta" wall newspaper of Russian Telegraph Agency (Russian Telegraph Agency) in Persian and Russian reads: Rasht 27 June 1920, Long Live Mirza Kuchek", in the honor of Mirza Kuchak Khan and celebration of the newly announced Soviet Republic of Gilan.

Flag of the Gilan SSR

Currency stamp of the Gilan SSR

By 1920, the Jangalis engaged in an uprising in which they demanded regional autonomy and national reforms. There was a turning point in the movement's history when the Red Army came into the Iranian port of Anzali from Baku, which the 11th Red Army had entered on 28 April. As a result, the Red Army and Jangalis agreed on the establishment of the bourgeois democratic and anti-British/anti-imperialist government in Gilan. The Red Caspian Flotilla and Jangalis under the command of Fyodor Raskolnikov and Sergo Ordzhonikidze defeated the British North Persia Force and recaptured Anzali on 18 May, advancing towards and entering Rasht with the help of the 11th Army on the same day. The 11th Army captured Rasht on the 4 June and the Jangalis subsequently proclaimed the Socialist Soviet Republic of Gilan on 5 June. This was followed by a coup d'état against Mirza on 31 July 1920. As a result, Dustdar became the Chairman of the Council of People's Commissars of Gilan, and thus the main leader of the Gilan SSR.

After this, the Jangalis were a key part of maintaining Socialist Soviet Republic of Gilan, showing that Marxists and Muslims could work together in a common cause. John Foran describes this collaboration:

The Communist Party of Iran, led by Haydar Khan Amoughlu, and the Jungle Movement, led by Mirza Kuchak Khan, had formed an alliance to build a soviet socialist republic. In addition, they sent a letter to Lenin asking for assistance in 'freeing us and all of the oppressed from the chain of Iranian and British oppressors.' They also sent a letter to Tehran proclaiming the monarch government illegitimate.

=== Fall of the Gilan SSR (1920–21) ===
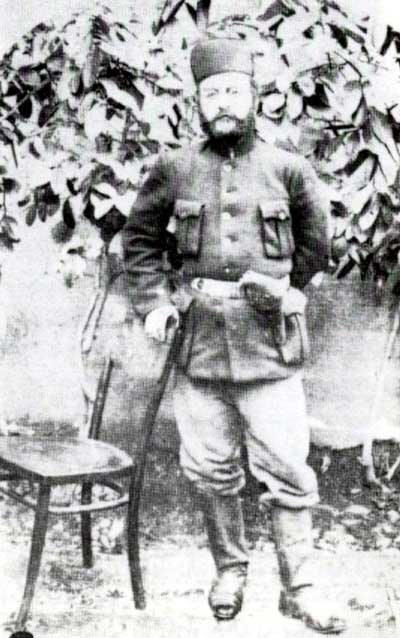
Ehsanollah Khan Dustdar, Chairman of the Council of People's Commissars of Gilan in 1920, Chairman of Revolutionary Committee of Gilan SSR twice in 1921

Meanwhile, Mirza Kuchik Khan began secret negotiations with the central government to eliminate the communists, leading to a coup in the Gilan government and later peace between the two forces. This ended the Marxist-Muslim cooperation in September 1920, as the Communist Party withdrew from the Jangali coalition. In January 1921, British commander Edmund Ironside would promote Reza Khan Pahlavi to command the Cossack Brigade and a coup d'état was launched the next month. Following this, the Soviets came to an agreement with the Iranian government to withdraw their troops, especially those assisting the Gilan SSR, and soon after the British declared they would be withdrawing their troops. Ultimately, the Soviets told Mirza that the Soviet Republic, due to changed circumstances, was compromised. As a result, there was an internal conflict in which the leader of the Communist Party, Heydar Khan Amo-oghli, was killed, the "Revolutionary Committee" of the Soviet Republic fell apart, and the Jangalis were defeated by Reza Khan when government forces captured Rasht in October, followed by the complete collapse of the Jangal movement shortly afterward. Mirza, along with his German companion, froze to death on 2 December as they tried to escape Khan's men. The Jangalis' Soviet republic had lasted close to two years before their leaders were killed and imprisoned.

== Legacy ==
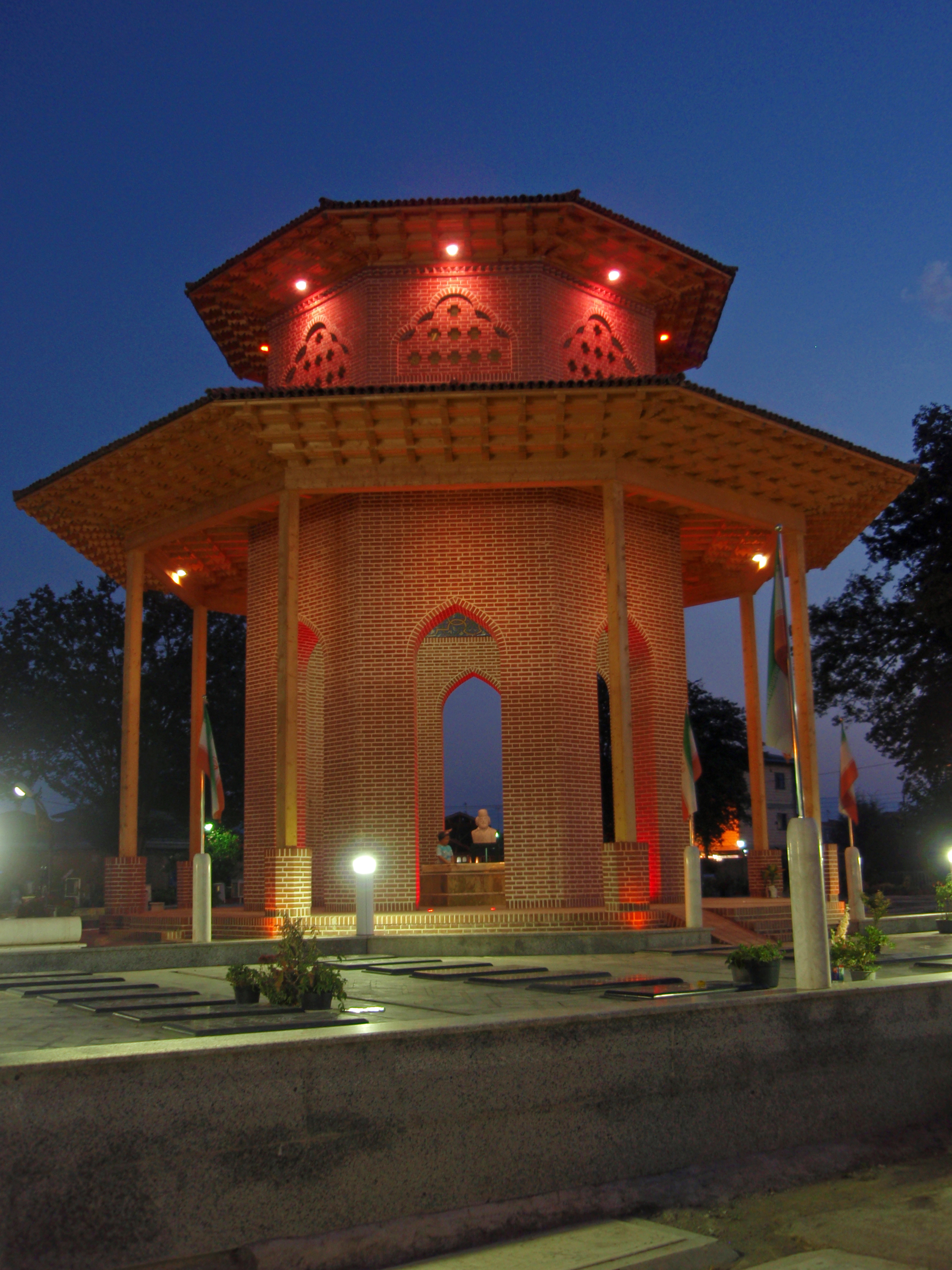
Mausoleum of Mirza Kuchik Khan

=== Jungle Party ===
The Jungle Party (Persian: حزب جنگل, romanized: Ḥezb-e Jangal; also translated Forest Party) was a secessionist party active in northern Iran during 1940s. The party was founded by armed rebels and some of Mirza Kuchik Khan's old associates who tried to revive the Persian Socialist Soviet Republic created in 1921 and used its red flag as a symbol. It allied with the Iran Party, Tudeh Party of Iran, Democratic Party of Iranian Kurdistan and Azerbaijani Democratic Party in 1946.

=== Jangal Group ===
There is no doubt that "Marxist-Muslim cooperation" as part of the Soviet Republic had a long-standing legacy on political and socialist organizing in the country, with one group of students organizing against the Shah in the 1960s called the "Jangal Group."

== Further analysis ==
Initially, when commencing the movement, Mirza and his allies formed a union called Ettehad-e-Islam (the Union of Islam). Although in the beginning, they were in conformity over the aims of the movement, eventually the movement began witnessing considerable friction as some members had diverging tendencies toward Ahmad Shah Qajar while others such as Mirza specifically called for an Iranian "Republic."

Not only did Mirza specifically use the term "Republic of Iran," as can be seen in his letters, but he had also declared his interest in a "Republic" before the advent of the Communist Party of Iran. In fact Mirza was removed from his posts in the Persian Socialist Soviet Republic only 17 days after the party's formation. Mirza did not seem to agree with Marxist ideology, being a devout man of faith, even though many of his allies until the end were members of the Communist Party.

== See also ==
- Jungle Party
- Persian Socialist Soviet Republic
- Persian Constitutional Revolution
