= Ehsanollah Khan Dustdar =

Iranian Marxist revolutionary (1884–1939)

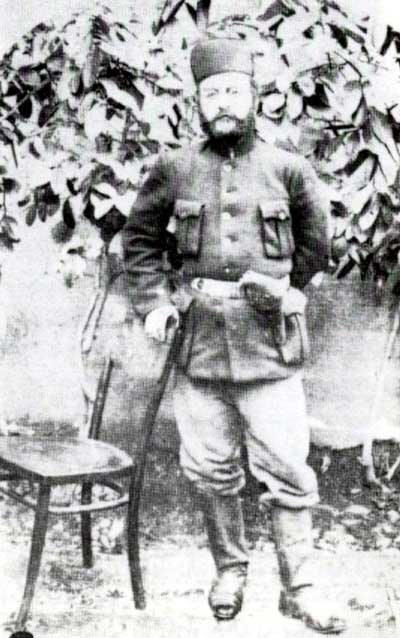
- Born: 1884; Sari, Qajar Iran
- Died: 19 March 1939; Moscow, Russian SFSR, USSR
- Known for: co-founding the Soviet Socialist Republic of Iran

Ehsān-Allāh Khān Dūstdār (Persian: احسان‌الله خان دوستدار), (1883 or 1884 – 10 March 1939) also known as "Red Comrade", was an early twentieth century Iranian Marxist revolutionary and leader of the Persian Socialist Soviet Republic. After spending nearly 20 years in exile in the Soviet Union he was executed during Stalin's Great Purge. He was subsequently exonerated following Stalin's death.

== Early life ==
He was born in Sari. His father, Mirza Ali Akbar Hafiz al-Sahha was an experimental physician; both his parents were Bábí, a 19th century religious movement largely absorbed by Baháʼí.

Ehsanollah Khan ignored the then-current Baháʼí doctrine against participation in politics and official activities. He studied for a short time at Dar ul-Funun University in Tehran, where he learned French, which gave him access to European radical political literature. He then joined the constitutionalist Mujahideen army in the struggle to depose Muhammad Ali Shah and re-establish the Constitution. He was with the troops that defeated the Shah's forces in 1909.

With the beginning of the First World War, he became a supporter of the pro-Ottoman/German groups battling Russian and British forces and in 1915 he joined the pro-German "provisional government" in Kermanshah and fought side by side with the Ottoman/German forces.

After the defeat of the Provisional Government, he returned to Tehran and joined the Punishment Committee, a group formed in Tehran in 1916 that assassinated people considered "traitors to the interests of the country", such as Ismail Khan, the head of the state granary, whom the Committee blamed for the shortages caused by his grain sales to the British. The committee was dissolved following the arrest of its leaders and prominent members in 1917.

== The Jungle Movement ==
The Jungle Movement was a rebellion against the monarchist rule of the Qajar dynasty that began in the forests of Gilan province to resist foreign intervention and later made common cause with Iranian communists and the Soviet Union. The rebellion lasted from 1915 to 1921.

Contrary to his claims, Ehsanollah Khan was not one of the founders of the Jungle Movement, but joined it in 1917. He fled to Gilan and, at the initiative of Mirza Kuchik Khan, joined the movement in the forests. After the October Revolution in Russia he took the leadership of the left wing of the Jangali and worked closely with the Bolsheviks. This faction advocated a pure communist program and Sovietization of Iran. It also aimed to establish a free education system throughout the country, with the ideology of "liberation from the chains of slavery and oppression for the benefit of the masses", nationalizing factories, mines, mills, water supply, banking and public transportation to create a national transportation system, the promotion of the cooperative system for artisans and small producers, the abolition of private agrarian property and the transfer of waqf lands to productive peasants for the development of a national housing system under the supervision of the central government and local councils, and the regulation of working conditions and public health through progressive legal reforms.

The leadership of the Jungle Movement was less radical. Near the end of 1917, the Jangalis organized a "Unity of Islam" committee, with members on the committee mainly comprising landlords and merchants. Still, they drew up a proposed constitution which accepted "private property in land" with certain limitations but also called for equality, majority rule, and freedom. Even with this, the Jangalis failed to change relations between landlords and peasants, but did continue to hold an anti-absolutist, anti-imperialist, and nationalist position displayed in their newspaper, Jangal, launched in 1917. In years that followed, the movement was gaining strength as disorder and insecurity swept the country.

== The Persian Socialist Soviet Republic ==
In May 1920 the Soviet Caspian Flotilla, led by Fyodor Raskolnikov and accompanied by Sergo Ordzhonikidze, entered the Caspian port of Anzali. This mission was declared to be only in pursuit of the Russian vessels and ammunition taken to Anzali by the White Russian counter-revolutionary General Anton Denikin, who had been given asylum by British forces in Anzali. The British garrison in Anzali soon evacuated the town without any resistance, retreating to Manjil.

Faced with the conflict between his movement and the united British and central government forces, Mirza Kuchak Khan, who had considered seeking support from Bolsheviks the year before, entered into an agreement with the Bolsheviks that included the proclamation of the Persian Socialist Soviet Republic, also known as the Soviet Republic of Gilan, under his leadership and the Soviets' promise not to intervene in the internal affairs of the republic.

After the formation of the Soviet Republic Ehsanollah Khan sought to join the Communist Party of Persia, but his application was denied. In late July 1920, he was associated with a coup d'état against Mirza and headed the new government dominated by the Communist Party. In this position, the Republic embarked on extremist policies such as property confiscation, anti-religious propaganda, and forcing money out of rich landlords, which weakened the nascent republic and caused division among the ranks of Gilan's freedom fighters. In September 1920, the Communist Party left the coalition.

== Life in exile ==
By 1921, after the agreement reached between the Soviet Union and Britain, the Soviets decided not to further support the Soviet Republic of Gilan. The Republic collapsed soon after, despite Ehsanollah Khan's attempts to sabotage the "friendship and cooperation" agreement between Tehran and Moscow by continuing land redistribution.

Nariman Narimanov, the head of the Council of People's Commissars of Soviet Azerbaijan, and Theodore Rothstein, the then Soviet ambassador to Iran, told Ehsanullah Khan to leave Iran. Ehsanollah Khan first went to Moscow.

Ehsanullah Khan's stay in Moscow did not last long. When he returned to Baku in late 1922, he was once again reminded that he had to live in silence and on the sidelines. Apparently, it was during this period that Ehsanullah Khan contacted the Iranian consul in Baku and sought permission to return to Iran. In a coded message sent from Moscow to Tehran, the Advisor to Iran's ambassador to the Soviet Union asked the opinion of the Ministry of Foreign Affairs on this matter. Tehran responds almost immediately: the government of Iran will allow Ehsanullah Khan to return, provided that he informs the authorities of his arrival date so that the government can consider a suitable place for him to live.

Apparently, the response of the Iranian government was not the response that Ehsanullah Khan expected. He was proud of his political past and was not in a position to accept the pardon of the Iranian government. So there was only one way left for him: insisting on his opposition to the central government of Iran.

Ehsanullah Khan, along with his associates Mohammad Jafar Kangavari, Ahmad Masafir and Ashouri, founded a new party called "Committee of the Liberation Revolution of Iran". The headquarters of the new party was an old shop in Baku, where Ashuri, the promoter and secretary of Ehsanullah Khan lived. In 1923 Ehsanullah Khan and his associates Seyyed Jalal and Ibrahim Khan directed revolutionary activities to bring about change in their homeland, Iran, from these relatively humble headquarters.

In the five years between 1923 and 1928 Soviet authorities gradually forced Ehsanullah Khan and his associates to accept a form of political isolation. The only evidence of his activity during these years is his performance in one of the first Soviet propaganda films made by Leo Moore, Gilan Ghazi (Girl of Gilan), about the Jungle Movement and its failure. In this film, Ehsanullah Khan appeared as himself; And the roles of famous characters such as Mirza Kuchak Khan were played by actors.

In the middle of the 1920s, the newly established OGPU ordered Ehsanullah Khan and his active entourage to surrender their personal weapons that they had taken with them when they left Anzali and entered the Caucasus. OGPU agents raided their headquarters in Baku and confiscated everything they had, even forbidding them to leave their residence. From then on, they were financially dependent on the small amount they received from the Commissariat of Internal Affairs.

In 1927, in the wake of uprisings against the newly established Pahlavi dynasty in Gilan, Khorasan and Azerbaijan in 1926, he appealed for support from the Soviet Union to return to Iran and tried to start revolutionary activities to overthrow the new monarchy. He received no assistance; Stalin and Bukharin ignored him. Ehsanullah Khan complained that the fate of the revolution in Iran depended on the outcome of diplomatic relations and declared that he was sure that the revolutionary movement would ultimately succeed against the Pahlavi regime and that the Soviets were responsible for the delay.

In Iran, the gradual consolidation and stabilization of Reza Khan's power finally paved the way for his kingdom. It was certainly not something that someone like Ehsanullah Khan would welcome and caused him to reconsider his past positions regarding Reza Shah. For him, Reza Khan was the main agent of "British imperialism" who relied on "the order of the master on the throne." In 1928, Ehsanullah Khan broke his five-year silence and once again returned to the scene of public political activity. This time he drew cartoons of Reza Shah and called him a puppet of "British imperialism". A number of these lithographic caricatures were sent by post to various addresses in Iran, including some government offices.

The Iranian authorities immediately reacted with anger to the publication of these images. Abdolhossein Teymourtash, the court minister and one of the most influential political figures of that time, called Yakov Davityan, the Soviet ambassador to Iran, and informed him of the official protest of the Iranian government. Davityan immediately contacted Moscow and Baku and informed Levon Mirzoyan, the First Secretary of the Communist Party of Azerbaijan, about the protest of the Iranian government. Davityan wrote in his confidential letter to Mirzoyan that Iranian officials, including Teymourtash, believe that Ehsanullah Khan was involved in this new conspiracy that endangers Iran-Soviet relations. According to Davityan, "such actions deeply harm the diplomatic relations between the two countries", Davityan wrote in his letter to Mirzoyan, "if these political activists are really happy with the continuation of their revolutionary actions, isn't it wiser to continue their activities in their own country and not from Soviet soil." In the end, he calls on the authorities of the Communist Party of Azerbaijan to "find a solution to get out of this predicament and stop Ehsanullah Khan and his group from activities that cause the diplomatic relations between the Soviet Union and Iran to be dark". The reaction to this call in Baku was immediate. Ehsanullah Khan and his associates were summoned to the OGPU and ordered to stop their political activities immediately.

In the late 1920s, pressure on non-Soviet communists living throughout the Soviet Union gradually increased. The Central Committee of the Communist Party of the Soviet Union, by issuing a new order, asked all the communist parties of the republics and the commissariat of internal and foreign affairs of each republic to take the necessary steps to convince all non-Soviet communists living in the Soviet Union to accept Soviet citizenship. As a result, a campaign was launched throughout the Soviet Union to "cleanse local parties", which began with the expulsion of members, especially members of immigrant ethnic groups, who had joined the party without following procedures. In addition, membership in the Communist Party was limited to the circle of Stalin's followers.

With the relative stabilization of the political atmosphere in Iran, the official relations between the Soviet Union and Iran became stronger. In the new situation, the mobilization of Iranians from the Caucasus and Turkestan was no longer very important. Both the Comintern and the Communist Party of the Soviet Union finally came to believe that there was no hope for a decisive change in the political landscape of Iran in the near future, and therefore, the Iranians of the Caucasus and Turkestan should encourage exiles such as Ehsanullah Khan to abandon the idea of temporary residence in the Soviet Union or any expectation of returning to Iran and encourage them to accept Soviet citizenship. The Communist Party of Iran was also informed to "carry out its revolutionary activities only in Iran" and leave the task of working on Iranians living in the Soviet Union to the local communist parties. In Azerbaijan, all foreign affairs offices of the Communist Party of Iran were closed and all its assets were handed over to the Communist Party of Azerbaijan. Finally, Iranians who worked directly for the Comintern were excluded from this policy. It was at this time that Ehsanullah Khan was repeatedly asked to accept Soviet citizenship, a request that he refused to accept.

== Arrest, death and rehabilitation ==
After the start of Stalin's purges, Ehsanullah Khan was accused, through people related to him, of trying to discredit the leadership of the Communist Party of Iran, especially Avetis Sultan-Zade, at the Baku meeting in 1931, at which he was not present. A few of OGPU's operatives were able to maintain surveillance over him and report his activities. It appears that Ehsanullah Khan and his associates believed that all the groups in the Soviet Union had forgotten them and that their financial and mental situation was much worse than that of the old communists.

The NKVD described Ehsanullah Khan and his associates as the most dangerous and destructive Iranians living in Azerbaijan in a report to Mir Jafar Baghirov, the First Secretary of the Communist Party of Azerbaijan, and specifically accused him of acting as agents of the British and Iranian intelligence services, the spread of poisonous propaganda among Iranians living in the Soviet Union, plotting to sabotage the Baku oil fields.

Ehsanullah Khan was arrested on December 24, 1937 in Baku. He was accused of "involvement in anti-Soviet activities, British and later German agency, membership in the Trotsky-Zinoviev circle, and anti-Comintern and anti-Communist Party of Iran activities". He was subjected to severe physical torture in the first stages of interrogation, but despite this, he denied all the charges. The interrogation in Baku lasted five months. In April 1938, he was sent to Moscow for further interrogation. In Moscow, the same accusations were made against him, and he, as before, rejected all the accusations and insisted on his innocence.

Ehsanullah Khan wrote a letter from the detention center to Anastas Mikoyan, who was an influential figure in the Soviet system and was familiar with him from Iran, as well as letters addressed to Nikolai Yezhov, the head of the NKVD, and also Stalin. In these letters, he mentioned his background as a loyal and committed revolutionary and that he was nicknamed "Red Comrade". He appealed to these leaders to intervene on his behalf and allow him to be tried in a "fair and public court". All those letters remained unanswered.

Finally, on March 19, 1939, his trial began in Moscow. At that time he was seriously ill. In the Moscow court, he once again denied all the charges and denied any connection with the German and British intelligence services. His trial lasted only 20 minutes. The judge sentenced him to death. On the morning of the 19th, he was handed over to the death squad in Moscow.

According to his youngest son Kaveh, Ehsanullah Khan's son Bahman was also arrested in 1937. The exact date of his death was not made public. His wife and two sons survived. Born in Baku, Kaveh became a Soviet citizen, lost his sight in World War II, and then studied and composed music. Another son, Faramarz, and his mother returned to Iran after Reza Shah was deposed in 1941. Also, Ehsanullah Khan had another son from his first marriage before leaving Iran, whom he never got to see.

After Stalin's death in 1953, Ehsanullah Khan was exonerated.

== See also ==
- Gilan
- Jungle Movement of Gilan
- The Jangal movement
