= Russo-Persian Treaty of Friendship =

1921 treaty between Soviet Russia and Persia

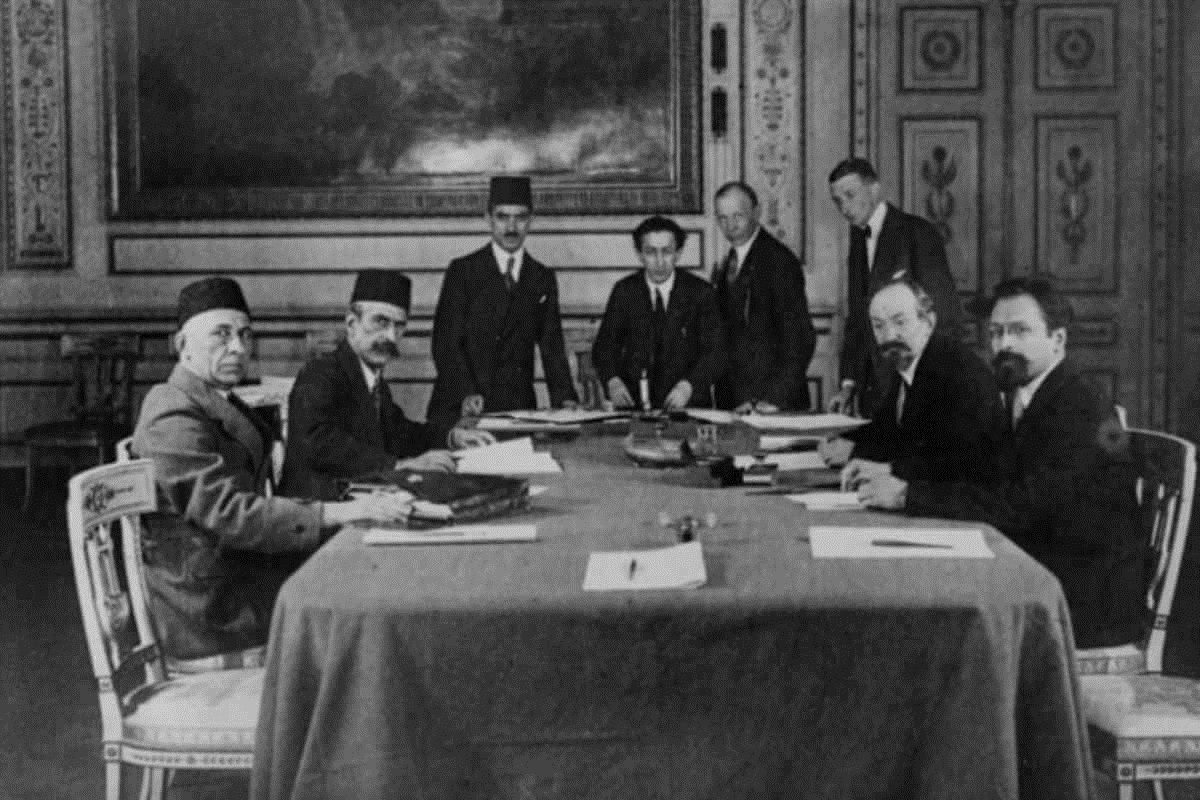
- Persian ambassador ʿAli-Qoli Ansari with Russian minister Georgy Chicherin and his deputy Lev Karakhan
- Type: Bilateral treaty
- Signed: 26 February 1921
- Location: Moscow, Russian SFSR
- Original signatories: Russian SFSR; Persia
- Signatories: (Russian Soviet Federative Socialist Republic) Georgy Chicherin; (Russian Soviet Federative Socialist Republic) Lev Karakhan; (Qajar Iran) ʿAli-Qoli Masʿud Ansari Moshaver al-Mamalek
- Ratifiers: Russian SFSR; Persia
- Languages: Russian; Persian

The Russo-Persian Treaty of Friendship was signed on 26 February 1921 in Moscow between representatives of Persia and Soviet Russia. Based on the terms of the treaty, all previous agreements made between the signatories including the Treaty of Turkmenchay were canceled. Moreover, both Russia and Iran were given full and equal shipping rights in the Caspian Sea along with the right to fly their respective national flags on their commercial vessels. Ratifications were exchanged in Teheran on 26 February 1922. It was registered in League of Nations Treaty Series on 7 June 1922. The original purpose of the treaty was to prevent White Russian counter-revolutionary forces who fled to Iran after the Bolshevik Revolution from attacking the Soviets from Iranian territory as had happened as late as 1918. The passage of the treaty, and particularly articles 5 and 6, was subject to vigorous debate in the Persian parliament; anti-British sentiment, however, led to its acceptance without alteration. The treaty would serve as the basis for a Soviet occupation in 1941, and articles 5 and 6 were eventually repudiated by Iran in 1979.

The treaty was signed by ʿAli-Qoli Masʿud Ansari Moshaver al-Mamalek on behalf of Iran, and on the Russian SFSR's behalf by Georgy Chicherin and his deputy Lev Karakhan.

== Excerpts ==
"Signed at Moscow, 26 February 1921

ARTICLE 5

The two High Contracting Parties undertake:

(1) To prohibit the formation or presence within their respective territories, of any organization or groups of persons, irrespective of the name by which they are known, whose object is to engage in acts of hostility against Persia or Russia, or against the Allies of Russia. They will likewise prohibit the formation of troops or armies within their respective territories with the aforementioned object.

(2) Not to allow a third party or organization, whatever it be called, which is hostile to the other Contracting Party, to import or to convey in transit across their countries material which can be used against the other party.

(3) To prevent by all means in their power the presence within their territories or within the territories of their Allies of all armies or forces of a third party in cases in which the presence of such forces would be regarded as a menace to the frontiers, interests or safety of the other Contracting Party.

ARTICLE 6

If a third party should attempt to carry out a policy of usurpation by means of armed intervention in Persia, or if such Power should desire to use Persian territory as a base of operations against Russia, or if a Foreign Power should threaten the frontiers of Federal Russia or those of its Allies, and if the Persian Government should not be able to put a stop to such menace after having been once called upon to do so by Russia, Russia shall have the right to advance her troops into the Persian interior for the purpose of carrying out the military operations necessary for its defence. Russia undertakes, however, to withdraw her troops from Persian territory as soon as the danger has been removed."

== 1921 Annex ==
(The Shah of Persia demanded Soviet clarification of Articles 5 & 6 of the Treaty of Friendship)

"Tehran, 12 December 1931 Your Excellency,

In reply to your letter dated 20th day of Ghows, I have the honour to inform you that Articles 5 and 6 are intended to apply only to cases in which preparations have been made for a considerable armed attack upon Russia or the Soviet Republics allied to her, by the partisans of the regime which has been overthrown or by its supporters among those foreign Powers which are in a position to assist the enemies of the Workers' and Peasants' Republics and at the same time to possess themselves, by force or by underhand methods, of part of the Persian territory, thereby establishing a base of operations for any attacks—made either directly or through the counter-revolutionary forces—which they might meditate against Russia or the Soviet Republics allied to her. The Articles referred to are therefore in no sense intended to apply to verbal or written attacks directed against the Soviet Government by the various Persian groups, or even by any Russian emigres in Persia, in so far as such attacks are generally tolerated as between neighboring Powers animated by sentiments of mutual friendship.

With regard to Article 13 and the small error to which you draw attention in Article 3 with reference to the Convention of 1881, I am in a position to state categorically, as I have always stated, that my Government, whose attitude towards the Persian nation is entirely friendly, has never sought to place any restrictions upon the progress and prosperity of Persia. I myself fully share this attitude, and would be prepared, should friendly relations be maintained between the two countries to promote negotiations with a view to a total or partial revision of these Articles on the lines desired by the Persian Government, as far as the interests of Russia permit.

In view of the preceding statements, I trust that, as you promised me in your letter, your Government and the Mejlis will ratify the Treaty in question as soon as possible.

I have the honour to be, Your Excellency, etc.

(Signed) ROTHSTEIN

Diplomatic Representative of the

Russian Socialist Federal Soviet Republic"

== See also ==
- List of treaties
- Treaty of Establishment, Commerce and Navigation

== Sources ==
- Mehdiyoun, Kamyar. "Ownership of Oil and Gas Resources in the Caspian Sea." The American Journal of International Law. Vol. 94, No. 1 (January 2000), pp. 179–189.
- Jacobson, Jon. When The Soviet Union Entered World Politics. University of California Press, 1994 pp. 66–67. ISBN 0520089766
