= Revolutionary Committee (Persia) =

Radical organization in Persia

The Revolutionary Committee (Persian: کمیته انقلابی, romanized: Komīte-ye enqelābī) was a radical revolutionary organization in Persia, founded in 1904. It played an important role in the Persian Constitutional Revolution.
