= Persian Socialist Soviet Republic =

Unrecognized state in Qajar Iran (1920–1921)

Persian Socialist Soviet Republic جمهوری شورايی سوسیالیستی ایران (Persian) Jomhuri-ye Šurâ-ye Sosiyâlisti-ye Irân
- 1920–1921
- Flag Emblem
- Anthem: انترناسیونال; The Internationale
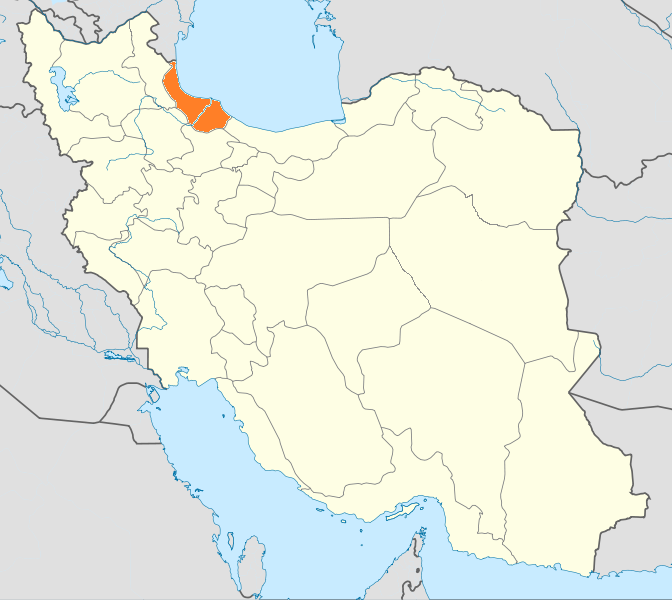
- Location of Gilan, where the Persian SSR was declared, in Iran
- Status: Unrecognized state
- Capital: Rasht
- Common languages: Gilaki; Talyshi
- Government: Soviet republic
- Chairman of Council of People's Commissars of Persian Soviet Republic
  - 1920: Mirza Kuchik Khan
  - 1920: Ehsanollah Khan Dustdar
  - 1920–1921: Haydar Khan Amo-oghli
- Chairman of Revolutionary Committee of Persian Socialist Soviet Republic
  - 1921: Ehsanollah Khan Dustdar
  - 1921: Mirza Kuchik Khan
  - 1921: Ehsanollah Khan Dustdar
- Historical era: Interwar period
  - Socialist Republic declared: May 1920
  - Russo-Persian Treaty: February 1921
  - Disestablished: September 1921
Preceded by	Succeeded by
Qajar Iran	Qajar Iran
- Today part of: Iran

The Persian Socialist Soviet Republic (Persian: جمهوری شورايی سوسیالیستی ایران), also known as the Socialist Soviet Republic of Gilan (Gilaki: گیلانˇ شؤرایي جؤمۊري) or the Gilan Republic, was a short-lived unrecognized state, a Soviet republic in north-west Persia, south of the Caspian sea. It lasted from June 1920 until September 1921 and was established by Mirza Kuchik Khan, a leader of the "Constitutionalist Movement of Gilan", and his Jangali partisans, with the assistance of the Soviet Russia's Red Army.

== Background and history ==
The Jungle movement that had started in 1914 gained momentum after the victory of the Bolsheviks in Russia. In May 1920 the Soviet Caspian Fleet, led by Fyodor Raskolnikov and accompanied by Sergo Orzhonikidze, entered the Caspian port of Anzali. This mission was declared to be only in pursuit of the Russian vessels and ammunition taken to Anzali by the White Russian counter-revolutionary General Denikin, who had been given asylum by British forces in Anzali. The British garrison in Anzali soon evacuated the town without any resistance, retreating to Manjil.

Faced with the conflict between his movement and the united British and central government forces, the Persian revolutionary Mirza Kuchak Khan considered several choices. Mirza had considered seeking support from Bolsheviks when a year before he traveled on foot to Lankaran to meet with them but by the time he arrived in that city, the Red forces had been forced to evacuate.

Amongst the Jangalis, there were many who felt that the Bolsheviks offered a real solution to the problems shared by both Russia and Iran, namely the domination of the upper classes and the Imperial Court. Kuchak Khan's second-in-command, Ehsanollah Khan Dustdar, had become a communist and an ardent advocate of an alliance with the Bolsheviks. Kuchak Khan, though hesitant and cautious towards such an idea due to both his religious and Persian nationalist background, accepted and the Jangalis entered into an agreement with the Bolsheviks.

This cooperation with the Soviet revolutionaries was based on some conditions including the announcement of the Persian Socialist Soviet Republic under his leadership and lack of any direct intervention by the Soviets in the internal affairs of the republic. The Soviets agreed to support him with ammunition and soldiers. Mirza offered to pay for the ammunition but the Soviets refused any payments.

== Declaration of the republic ==
In May 1920, the Persian Soviet Socialist Republic, or Socialist Soviet Republic of Gilan, came into being. The republic did not redistribute land to poor peasants, to the dismay of the more radical forces of the Jangal movement. Therefore, soon disagreements arose between Mirza and his group of advisors on one side and the Soviets and the Communist Party of Persia (evolved from the Baku-based Edalat (Justice) Party) on the other.

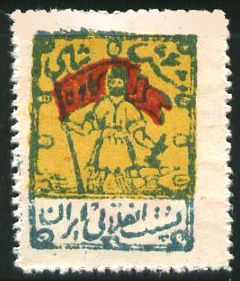
Stamp of Persian Soviet Socialist Republic, 1920, showing the legendary rebel Kaveh the Blacksmith – one hand holding a hammer, and the other anachronistically waving the republic's red flag

On June 9, 1920 Mirza Kuchak Khan left Rasht in protest and also to avoid military confrontation (which he had always avoided as much as possible, even while fighting with the central government forces) and opened the way for the Communist (Edalat) party to set a coup d'état. The new administration, formally under Ehsanollah Khan but actually under the influence of Batyrbek Abukov (the Soviet Commissar) started a series of radical activities such as anti-religious propaganda, or forcing money out of the rich landlords.

Conservative elements characterized these measures as simply the latest features of longstanding Russian interference in the region, and the middle-class were antagonized by the level of violence, disrespect for property, and the Russian ties of the Jangali movement. The republic also lost support from the general population due to the exceedingly high number of war refugees who began flooding the urban centers, thus posing a significant economic problem.

== First Cabinet ==
- Mohammad taghi Pir bazari – Finance commissioner
- Mir shams el din vaghari (Vagahr ol saltane) – Interial commissioner
- Seyyed Jafar Pishevari – Foreign commissioner
- Mahmud Reza – Justice commissioner
- Abolghasem Rezazade (Fakhraei) – Trade commissioner
- Nasrollah Reza – Post & telegraph commissioner
- Mohammadali Gilak (Khomami) – Public benefits commissioner
- Ali Habibi – Police chief
- Dr. Mansur Bavar – Health head chief
- Mirza Shokrollah khan Tonekaboni (keyhan) – Research chief
- Amir taka – Head of war commission

=== Coup d'état ===
Mirza's efforts to resolve the bloody disputes by sending a petition through a delegate of two of his men to Soviet premier Vladimir Lenin did not result in a resolution. By 1921, and particularly after the agreement achieved between the Soviet Union and Britain, the Soviets decided not to further support the Soviet Republic of Gilan. The Russo-Persian Treaty of Friendship (1921) was then signed, ensuring peaceful relations between the two countries and resulting in the withdrawal of Soviet forces.

Reza Khan Mirpanj, who had initiated a successful coup d'état with Seyyed Zia'eddin Tabatabaee several days beforehand, then began reasserting central government control over Gilan and Mazandaran. The Soviet Republic of Gilan officially came to an end in September 1921. Mirza and his German friend Gauook (Hooshang) fled alone into the Alborz Mountains, and died of frostbite. It is said that his body was decapitated by a local landlord and his head was displayed in Rasht to establish the government's new hegemony over revolution and revolutionary ideas.

== Historical analysis ==
Historians have tried to analyze the factors that contributed to the demise of the Jangal movement. Some of the main studies including those by Gregor Yeghikian and Ebrahim Fakhrayi (Minister of Culture in Kuchak Khan's Cabinet of the Soviet Republic) suggest a role for both extremist actions taken by the Communist (Edalat) Party that provoked opposing religious sentiment among the public, and Mirza Kuchak Khan's religious and at times somewhat conservative views on collaboration with the Communist Party as possible factors.

Cosroe Chaqueri has suggested also that the change of policy on the Soviet side regarding pursuing global revolution versus establishing and protecting the Soviet Union was the main reason for them to withdraw support from the Gilan Republic. The second option got more support and therefore Soviets signed the Anglo-Soviet Trade Agreement with the British in London (1921) which required them to retreat from Northern Iran. Correspondence between Theodore Rothstein, the Soviet ambassador in Tehran, and Mirza Kuchak Khan clearly supports this view. As part of his peace making efforts, Rothstein had also sent a message to the Soviet officers among Ehsanollah Khan's one thousand strong force that had made its way towards Qazvin, not to obey his orders and as a result that campaign was defeated.

Historian Kayhan A. Nejad counters that Soviet leaders in Moscow only began to withdraw support from the Gilan Republic after months of infighting between its communist and non-communist factions, which set into motion a process of internal collapse.

== See also ==
- List of states and regions involved in the Russian Civil War
- Bibliography of the Russian Revolution and Civil War
- Outline of the Russian Revolution and Civil War
- Constitutionalist movement of Gilan
- Jungle Party
- Tudeh Party
- Avetis Sultan-Zade
