= Mirza Kuchik Khan =

Iranian revolutionary (1880–1921)

Mirza Younis Kuchak Khan
- میرزا یونس کوچک خان
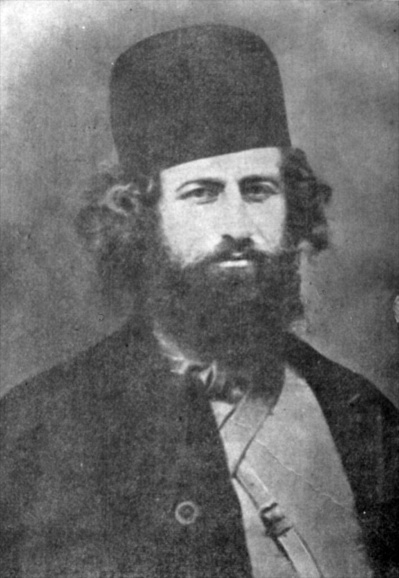

2nd Chairman of Revolutionary Committee of Persian Socialist Soviet Republic
- In office 8 May 1921 – September 1921
- Preceded by: Ehsanollah Khan Dustdar
- Succeeded by: Ehsanollah Khan Dustdar

Chairman of Council of People's Commissars of Persian Soviet Republic
- In office 5 June 1920 – 31 July 1920
- Preceded by: Office instituted
- Succeeded by: Office abolished

Personal details
- Born: Yunes; 12 October 1880 Rasht, Qajar Persia
- Died: 2 December 1921 (aged 41) Khalkhal, Iran
- Party: Unity of Islam Party (1915–18)
- Other political affiliations: Moderate Socialists Party (1910s)
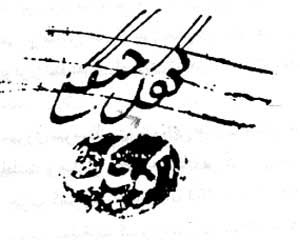
- Signature

Mirza Younis Kuchik Khan (Gilaki: مئرزا کۊجي خان or ميرزا کۊچي خؤن; Persian: میرزا كوچک خان; common alternative spellings: Kouchek, Koochek, Kuchak, Kuchek, Kouchak, Koochak, Kuçek; October 12, 1880 – December 2, 1921) was an Iranian revolutionary leader and the president of the Gilan Socialist Soviet Republic. He was the founder of a revolutionary movement based in the forests of Gilan in northern Iran that became known as the Nehzat-e Jangal (The Jungle Movement). This uprising started in 1914 and remained active against internal and foreign enemies until 1921 when the movement was completely abandoned after the demise of Mirza Kuchak Khan.

== Early life ==
Mirza Kuchak Khan was born Yunes, son of Mirza "Bozorg" (the Persian equivalent of "Sir"), and was thus nicknamed Mirza "Kuchak" (the Persian equivalent of "Jr"), in the city of Rasht in northern Iran in 1880. His father was a merchant from Gilan.

== Political activities ==
In June 1908, the Iranian Parliament was shut down during a coup d'état ordered by the new monarch, Mohammad Ali Shah Qajar. The Russian Cossack Brigade, under the command of Colonel Liakhov serving the Shah, bombarded the parliament and arrested pro-democracy leaders, activists, journalists, and members of Parliament. Uprisings all over the country followed, particularly in Tabriz, Ardabil and Rasht. During the Tabriz uprising, Kuchak Khan tried to join Sattar Khan & Haj Baba Khan-e- Ardabili's forces, but was unable to actively participate due to an illness. He was injured during the Constitutionalist war and had to travel to Baku and Tbilisi for medical attention.

After going through a period of renewed and bloody dictatorship nicknamed the Short Dictatorship (or Lesser Autocracy), on July 1909, the national revolutionary forces from Gilan and central Iran (Bakhtiari tribes) were united to attack and conquer the capital Tehran. Mirza Kuchak Khan was one of the lower ranked commanders of the force that invaded the capital from the North (under the command of Sepahdar Aazam Mohammad Vali Khan Tonekaboni).

== Jangal movement ==
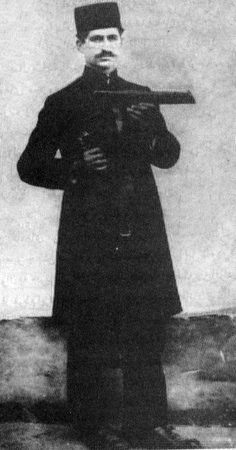
Mirza Kuchak Khan before starting the rebellion (around 1914).

Given the shortcomings of the advanced social thinkers and activists of the time on one hand and the stronger establishment of the old autocracy on the other hand, again the same privileged class and their political representatives took control of the new regime. The freedom fighters were not satisfied and were in fact disarmed, in some cases using force. Meanwhile, the direct and indirect manipulation of the country's internal politics by Tsarist Russians and the British increased the social unrest within Iran.

It was during such tumultuous period that Mirza Kuchak Khan, in collaboration with the Society of Islamic Union, started his uprising in the northern forests (Southern Caspian). Initially, the headquarters of the movement was in Kasma. Mirza Kuchak Khan's return to Rasht was not easy since he had been expelled from Gilan by the Russian consulate for five years. His cause seems to have been a mixture of that of the newly emerging national bourgeoisie and downtrodden peasants and therefore gained momentum soon after it started. The Jangal forces (locally referred to as 'Jangalis' i.e., 'People of the Jungle' in Persian) defeated the local governmental and Russian troops which added to their reputation as potential saviors of the ideas of the constitutional revolution.

On June 12, 1918 Manjil was the site of a battle between the Jangali troops and the joint British and White Russian forces. The latter force (led by General Dunsterville and Colonel Lazar Bicherakhov) although formally just trying to organize the return of Russian soldiers back home, in reality was planning to pass through Manjil as the only passage to the Caspian in order to reach Baku and fight against the newly formed Baku commune (led by Stepan Shahumian). General Dunsterville's private diaries and notes, including those kept during his command of the Dunsterforce Mission to North Persia and Baku, are transcribed from the original by General Dunsterville's great granddaughter, and are co-located on the Great War Primary Documents Archive. Mirza Koochek Khan's troops were defeated in this war because of the use of artillery, armored car and airplanes by the joint forces. Mirza's field commander was a German officer (Major Von Pashen) who had joined the Jangal movement after being released by them from the British prison in Rasht.

The Jangal movement was further boosted and gained gravity after the victory of the Bolsheviks in Russia. On May 1920, the Soviet Navy led by Fyodor Raskolnikov and accompanied by Grigoriy Ordzhonikidze, entered the Caspian port of Anzali. This mission was declared to be only in pursue of the Russian vessels and ammunition taken to Anzali by the White Russian counter-revolutionary general Denikin, who had been given asylum by British forces in Anzali.

== Socialist Republic of Gilan ==
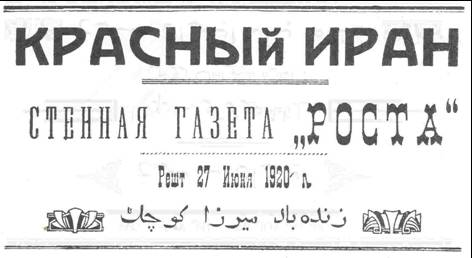
Red Iran wall newspaper of Russian Telegraph Agency (Russian Telegraph Agency) in Persian and Russian reads: Rasht June 27, 1920, Long Live Mirza Kuchek", in the honor of Mirza Kuchak Khan and celebration of the newly announced Soviet Republic of Gilan.

Mirza Kuchak Khan agreed to cooperate with the Soviet revolutionaries on some conditions including the announcement of the Socialist Republic of Gilan (also known as The Red Republic of the Jungle) under his leadership and lack of any direct intervention by the Soviets in the internal affairs of the republic. However, soon disagreements arose between Mirza and his group of advisors on one side and the Soviets and the Communist Party of Persia (evolved from the Baku-based Edalat Party). Mirza's efforts to resolve the bloody disputes by sending a petition through a delegate of two of his men to Lenin did not result in a resolution. By 1921 and particularly after the agreement achieved between the Soviet Union and Britain the Soviets decided not to further support the Socialist Republic of Gilan and as a result the government forces led by colonel Reza Khan (the future Reza Shah) overran the dispersed forces of the Jungle Republic. There is however, a different point of view that believes Mirza Kuchak Khan and his inner circles were not at the advantage to deal with and to accomplish major radical social changes such as abandoning feudalism in Gilan which would have served the republic tremendously paving the way for its final victory.

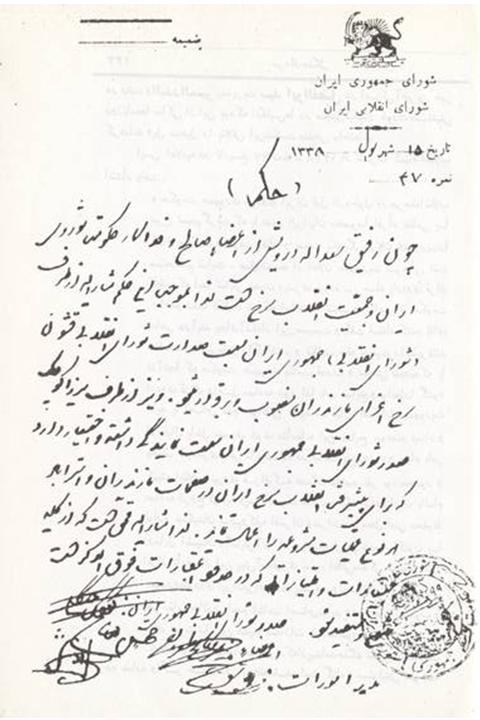
Letter of assignment of Comrade Saadollah Darvish signed by Mirza Koochak Khan

Saadollah Darvish is appointed as the Chair of the Revolutionary Council (Commissar) of the forces missioned to Mazandaran Province, to promote the Red Iranian Revolution in that province. The letter is signed by Mirza Kuchak Khan (his usual signature Kuchek-e Jangali i.e., Kuchek of the Jungle) and other members of the Revolutionary Council of The Republic of Iran, 1920. The tone and the terminology used in the letter shows the revolutionary fervor of the time and, contrary to the suggestion of conservatism on Mirza's side by some historians, his devotion to the ideas of socialism.

== Mirza's death ==
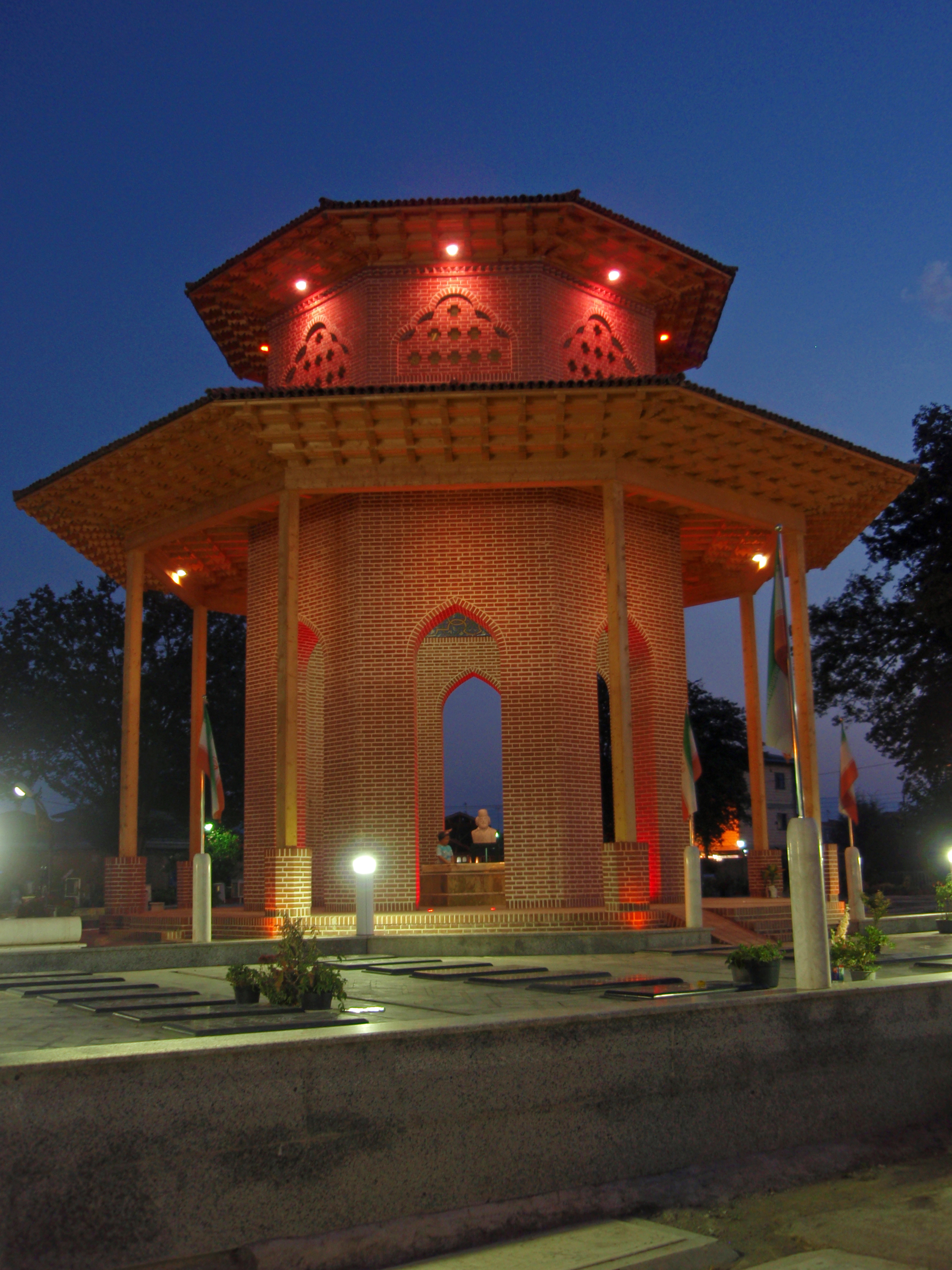
Mirza Kuchik Khan Mausoleum in Rasht

Mirza and his companion named Gaouk, a Russian-German revolutionary adventurer, left alone in Talesh mountains around "Masal", both died of frostbite. His body was decapitated by a local landlord and his head was displayed in Rasht to establish the government's new hegemony over revolution and revolutionary ideas. They buried his body in Soleymandarab in Rasht and sent his severed head to Cossack commander Reza Khan (who later became the first Pahlavi King of Iran) in Tehran. During the Second World War and after the departure of Reza Shah for exile, friends of Mirza Kuchak brought his head back from Tehran and buried it in his tomb. The tomb of Mirza kuchak in Rasht was reconstructed after the Islamic revolution.

== Historical analysis ==
Historians have tried to analyze the factors that contributed to the demise of the Jangal Movement. Some of the main studies including those by Gregory Yeghikian and Ebrahim Fakhrayi (minister of Culture in Mirza's Cabinet of the Red Republic) suggest a role for both extremist actions taken by the Communist (Edalat) Party that provoked opposing religious sentiment among the public, and Mirza Koochak Khan's religious and at times somewhat conservative views on collaboration with the Communist Party as possible factors.

It has been suggested also that the change of policy on the Soviet side regarding pursuing global revolution (as advocated by Trotsky) versus establishing and protecting the Soviet Union was the main reason for them to withdraw support from the Gilan republic. The second option got more support and therefore Soviets signed a treaty with British in London (1921) which necessitated withdrawing from Northern Iran. Correspondence between Theodore Rothstein, the Soviet ambassador in Tehran, and Mirza Koochak Khan supports this view (Ebrahim Fakhrayi). As part of his peace making efforts, Rothstein had also sent a message to the Soviet officers among Ehsanollah Khan's one thousand strong force that had made its way towards Qazvin, not to obey his orders and as a result that campaign was defeated however, this view has been challenged by other historians emphasizing Kuchak Khan's limited view of revolution given his socio-economic and ideological position.

== See also ==
- Gilan
- Iran-Russia relations
- Iranian Constitutional Revolution
- Jungle Movement of Gilan
- Nisar Muhammad Yousafzai
- Mostafa Sho'aiyan
