= Left-wing guerrilla groups of Iran =

Several left-wing guerrilla groups attempting to overthrow the pro-Western regime of Shah Mohammad Reza Pahlavi were notable and active in Iran from 1971 to 1979. The groups shared a commitment to armed struggle, but differed in ideology. Most were Marxist in orientation. The largest group — People's Mujahedin of Iran — was founded as a left wing movement with the aim to overthrow Iran's cleric rule.

Four guerrilla organizations — the Feda'i, the pro-Tudeh Feda'i Munsh'eb, the Islamic Mujahedin and the Organization of Struggle for the Emancipation of the Working Class — are said to have "delivered the regime its coup de grace," in the street fighting of February 9–11, 1979.

== Background ==
According to Ervand Abrahamian, a scholar of the subject:

In terms of political background, the guerrillas can be divided into five groups:

1. the Sazaman-i Cherikha-yi Feda'i Khalq-i Iran (The Organization of the Iranian People's Guerrilla Freedom Fighters), known in short as the Marxist Feda'i;
2. the Sazman'i Mujahedin-i Khalq-i Iran [or the People's Mujahedin of Iran];
3. the Marxist offshoot from the Mujadedin, known as the Marxist Mujahedin or Peykar;
4. small Islamic groups on the whole limited to one locality: Gorueh-i Abu Zarr (Abu Zarr Group) in Nahavand, Gorueh-i Shi'iyan-i Rastin (True Shi'i Group) in Hamadan, Gorueh-i Allah Akbar (Allah Akbar Group) in Isfahan, and Goreueh-i al-Fajar (Al-Fajar Group) in Zahedan;
5. small Marxist groups. These included both independent groups, such as the Sazman-i Azadibakhshi-i Khalqha-yi Iran (Organization for the Liberation of the Iranian Peoples), Gorueh-i Luristan (Luridtan Group), and Sazman-i Arman-i Khalq (Organization for the People's Ideal); and cells belonging o political parties advocating armed struggle —the Tofan group, the Revolutionary Organization of the Tudeh party, the Kurdish Democratic party, and a new left organization named Grouh-i Ittehad-i Komunistha (Group of United communists). Moreover, some of the feda'is had at the time of their death joined the Tudeh party.

Guerrilla groups formed it is believed, because the non-armed, mass-based communist Tudeh Party was under such intense repression it was unable to function, while in the outside world guerillas Mao Zedong, General Võ Nguyên Giáp and Che Guevara were having, or had had, much success. The Iranian guerrilla strategy has been described by Abrahamian as "heroic deeds of violent resistance to break the spell of government terror".

In a situation where there are no firm links between the revolutionary intelligentsia and the masses, we are not like fish in water, but rather like isolated fish surrounded by threatening crocodiles. Terror, repression, and absence of democracy have made it impossible for us to create working-class organizations. To break the spell of our weakness and to inspire the people into action we must resort to revolutionary armed struggle...

The background of the guerrillas was overwhelming educated middle class. From 1971 to 1977 an estimated 341 of them were killed, of whom over 90% of those for whom information could be found were intellectuals.

== History ==
The event from which most historians mark the beginning of the guerrilla era in Iran was the February 8, 1971 attack on a gendarmerie post at Siahkal on the Caspian Sea. Guerillas killed three policemen and freed two previously arrested guerrillas.

The guerrilla organizations were quite active in the first half of the 1970s. In the two and half years from mid 1973 through 1975, three United States colonels, a Persian general, a Persian sergeant, and a Persian translator of the United States Embassy were all assassinated by guerrilla groups. In January 1976 eleven persons sentenced to death for these killings.

By the second half of the 1970s, however, the groups were in decline, suffering from factionalism and government repression.

- The Iranian People's Sacrificing Guerrillas (Cherik'ha-ye Feda'i-ye Khalq-e Iran), according to one of the group's leaders, `disintegrated and disappeared` after `the blows of 1976`, `set itself principally to protecting itself,` and engaged only in `scattered actions` to show that it still existed. Only a few dozen members remained at large. Ideologically, the group decided that objective conditions for revolution didn't exist, and as the Islamist movement escalated, the organization claimed credit for relatively few actions - one in the summer 1977, two in early 1978, and five in the summer of 1978, according to the group's pronouncements. At the end of the year, with membership presumably growing, the organization picked up its pace, claiming credit for a half-dozen actions in December 1978 and a dozen in January 1979.

=== Iranian Revolution ===
By late 1978 however, the massive demonstrations, return of oppositionists from abroad, and pressure on the monarchy's security forces from the revolutionary movement revived the groups. Guerilla groups became active "both in killing Iranian military and police leaders and participating in oppositional demonstrations ... in the course of 1978 ... the Fedaiyan and the Mojahedin were able to ... become sizable movements, largely of young people."

== Groups ==
- Democratic Party of Iranian Kurdistan
  - Kurdistan Democratic Party
- Komala Society of Revolutionary Toilers of Iranian Kurdistan
  - Komala Kurdistan's Organization of the Communist Party of Iran
    - Socialist Faction of Komala
  - Komala Party of Iranian Kurdistan
    - Komala of the Toilers of Kurdistan
    - Komala Party of Iranian Kurdistan – Reunification Faction
- Organization of Communist Revolutionaries (Marxist–Leninist)
  - Union of Iranian Communists (Sarbedaran)
    - Communist Party of Iran (Marxist–Leninist–Maoist)
- Organization of Iranian People's Fedai Guerrillas
  - Iranian People's Fedai Guerrillas
  - Organization of Iranian People's Fedaian (Majority)
    - Organization of Iranian People's Fedai Guerrillas – Majority Left Wing
  - Organization of Iranian People's Fedai Guerrillas (Minority)
    - Organization of Iranian People's Fedai Guerrillas – Followers of the Identity Platform
    - Organization of Iranian People's Fedai Guerrillas (1985)
    - Fedaian Organisation (Minority)
- People's Mujahedin of Iran
  - Peykar

Islamic Nations Party
Kurdistan Free Life Party
Kurdistan Freedom Party
People's Democratic Front
Union of Communist Militants
Worker-communist Party of Iran – Hekmatist
Worker's Way

== See also ==
- List of guerrilla movements
- Organizations of the Iranian Revolution

== Sources ==
- Iran Between Two Revolutions By Ervand Abrahamian, Princeton University Press, 1982
- Mottahedeh, Roy, The Mantle of the Prophet : Religion and Politics in Iran, One World, Oxford, 1985, 2000
