= Union of People's Fedaian of Iran =

The Union of People's Fedaian of Iran (Persian: سازمان اتحاد فداییان خلق ایران) is a socialist organization that publishes a monthly magazine called Iran Today.

The organization was established in April 1994, following the Convention of Unity Congress.

== History ==
The Union of People's Fedaian of Iran emerged from a series of political, theoretical, and organizational discussions between the two currents of Fedaie movement: Organization of Iranian People's Fedai Guerrillas and Fedaian Organization.

The first steps towards the Union of People's Fedaian of Iran started with the Organization of Iranian People's Fedai Guerrillas. The earlier signs of this organization started in the early 1960s, when Bijan Jazani lead the first left-wing armed movement. After several attacks on outpost in Northern Iran, The organization became official on February 8, 1971, after Jazani infiltrated a Gendarmerie outpost in northern Iran. From 1971 to 1979, the organization came under intensive attacks. Over 300 people in the organization were murdered by Mohammad Reza Pahlavi's regime. One of these casualties was the movement's leader, Bijan Jazani. Who died on April 19, 1978, during one of the deadliest strikes by the regime. He and six of his comrades were murdered in a regime prison. Although the group suffered many casualties, the organization still held on strong.

=== Revolution ===
All of these different groups took part in the Iranian revolution in 1979. Soon after the revolution, they fought against the newly established Islamic Republic of Iran.

During the revolution, Iran established a wide arrange of public offices scattered through most Iranian cities. They became gathering places for Marxism–Leninism pro-justice Iranian youngsters. The Fedaian's received 10% of the vote during the first elections after the revolution. The left-wing organization sought equality and leadership for the proletariat. The organizations took part in protest movements against the new regimes and repressive policies.

While the group had a favourable social and political position from which to organize, it failed to achieve its goals. Some surmise that this was due to a lack of necessary political experience, an unclear view of how the people could be organized, and no comprehensive agenda.

=== Split ===
The first reaction to this failure resulted in the split of the organization into two parts: the Majority and the Minority.

The separation of the organization came after organizational reforms that were announced on the Azadi square in Tehran. On May 1, 1981, over one hundred thousand Fedaian supporters gathered for an important leadership announcement. The organization announced that it will no longer be a guerrilla, but a political party in support of the Iranian working class. The minority split from the party. The majority renamed the party the Organization of Iranian People's Fedai Guerrillas – Majority Left Wing(OPFIM). Their focus shifted towards unity-critique policies against the Islamic Republic. In the following years, the party would gain notoriety through newspaper media, which circulated around 300 thousand newspapers in 4 years. by the end of these years the party had around twenty thousand followers, with most of them being women, students, working-class workers and artists.

The minority group renamed themselves the OIPFG. They found that the party should not just become a political organization, but should keep their guerrilla form of warfare. They argued the importance of how they would help in the Iraqi Kurdish Civil War. They announced a plan of taking of the US embassy on the 3rd of November 19, 1979 to express their negative feelings towards the US and Capitalism.

While the split revealed the right and left currents within the organization, a lack of the experience of internal dialogues and democratic standards meant that the splitting currents could not define their ideological, political and organizational differences. This led to further division within the ranks of the Majority and Minority.

=== The Era of oppression ===
The OIPFG minority rebellious nature made them an early target for the Iranian technocratic establishment. Hundreds of supporters were murdered during the beginnings of the repression of the minority party, pushing them to the Kurdish rebel region in 1982. The group fled to Kurdistan, where they quickly fell in too personal conflict. The conflicts resulted in a stand-off in the kurdish village of Gâpilon. After the conflict, the group split up in several smaller fractions. four of these fractions, the OIPFG followers of the Identity Platform, the Organization of Fdaiyan, the minority cell and the OIPFG supreme council would later reunite and together with the OPFIM and Tudeh Party of Iran become the Union of Peoples Fedaian Iran.

The rise of OPFIM majority had not gone unnoticed by the Iranian fundamentalist. Although the party tried to not conflict with the government, their existence could not be tolerated. Even though OPFIM took a supportive stance towards Iran's war with Iraq, and they adapt to the anti-American politics and even collaborated with the Islamic state to fight to take down the Kurdish rebellions. This; however, did not change the Islamic states position on the party, and they were forbidden from holding their activities and protest. OPFIM continued with their activities, and from 1981 to 1983 hundred OPFIM members were murdered and thousands were sent off to prison camps, forcing most of the remaining members to flee the country. OPFIM, due to its repression became the biggest outside state political party with over 500 thousand supporters.

During the years of oppression, the OPFIM majority had already made several efforts to merge with the Tudeh Party of Iran, however; this had never been successful. The merge was eventually accepted by a sub-party that split from the OPFIM, the OIPF led by Ali-Mohammed Farkonda. The OIPF was one of the powers that ended up creating the Union of People's Fedaian of Iran.

=== Post Repression Era ===
The OPFIM held their first official congress again in August 1990. This congress was held outside the country, as the party had stayed outside the Technocratic Iranian's regime territory. The congress focussed on a re-examination of earlier created policies, the political situation in Iran and its internal relations. The lack of experience of internal dialogues and democratic standards had meant a big part of the organization had split up in different groups. The new OPFIM was critical of its history and its leadership and did not want to full victim to similar circumstances. The organization, therefore, decided to transfer the leaderships' role to a new group. To make sure this would go well, they organized a second congress immediately, one year later. Recognizing past mistakes and different governmental perspective helped the OPFIM to reunite.

The OPFIM made some drastic changes to their organization in the 1990s. The Organization made a declaration that democracy was a fundamental part to their goal for social justice. Variety in perspectives and political distinctions were formally acknowledged and endorsed. Socialism became the new ultimate goal for the party. From this moment, congresses would be held every other year. In 1994 many of these concepts were adapted in the Union of People's Fedaian. Congresses are held every other year. Policies and views are discussed and either denied or approved. The political situation is assessed and the several congresses that form the organization come to agreements about the suggested rules and bills. During their 10th congress, the organization discussed the party's unity. This congress took place in 2007, and spoke about new ways to organize an alternative for the islamic republic

=== Reunification ===
Some people from the left and right currents of previous splits have come back together under the Union of People's Fedaian of Iran banner.

The right current that is present in the reunified organization continue to promote reformist and conciliatory policies towards the regime. However, it has clearly distinguished itself both theoretically and ideologically from the Majority. When the dissolution of the Majority section into the Tudeh Party of Iran was proposed, this group split from the Majority in defiance. In the following years this current, having learned its lesson from the previous failures, criticized its past policies and gradually returned to the revolutionary left movement. In 1989, the Fedaie Organization of Iran was formed, as a result of the unity between this organization and the Organization for the Emancipation of Labor. (The latter had been established by the former cadres and members of the Minority.)

The left current present in the reunified Union of People's Fedaian of Iran, was initially aligned with the Minority. In spite of its revolutionary stance against the regime, it adopted ultra leftist policies. The Minority also faced several splits because of the lack of a clear agenda.

The progress toward reunification of Fedaies was made possible through the revision of the theoretical principles, proposing clear political lines, dispensing with sectarian attitudes toward unity and coalition, learning from the past failures, and achieving principled understanding about democratic relations among the left forces as well as within the organization ranks.

== See also ==
- Guerrilla groups of Iran
- Iranian People's Fedai Guerrillas
- Organization of Iranian People's Fedaian (Majority)
- Fedaian Organisation (Minority)
- Organization of Iranian People's Fedai Guerrillas
