= Mostafa Madani =

Iranian communist politician and senior member of the OIPFG

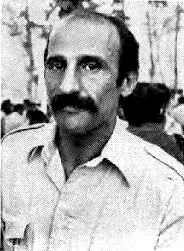
- Madani in 1979
- Political party: OIPFG (1970s–1980); OIPFG (Majority) (1980); OIPFG–MLW (1980–1982); OIPFG (Minority) (1982–1985)

Mostafa Madani (Persian: مصطفی مدنی) is an Iranian communist politician and one of the senior members of the Organization of Iranian People's Fedai Guerrillas.

== Political career ==
Madani joined Organization of Iranian People's Fedai Guerrillas in the 1970s. As of 1979, he was considered a leading figure in the group, and held position as a member of both executive and central committees. He unsuccessfully ran for an Assembly of Experts for Constitution seat from Tehran constituency, garnering 100,894 votes. He and Farrokh Negahdar wanted to convince Mohammad Beheshti of the Islamic Republican Party to form an anti-imperialist front, a request that was not accepted. He became critical of the new regime, attacking it for being undemocratic and reactionary while Negahdar maintained that it was on the right track.

After the 1980 schism in the organization, Madani was initially with the majority faction but following disagreements with the leadership, he led a short-lived offshoot that split from the majority and was merged into the minority faction in 1982. In 1985, he broke away from the faction along with Hammad Sheybani and started a new group.
