= Taher Ahmadzadeh =

Iranian politician 1921–2017

- طاهر احمدزاده
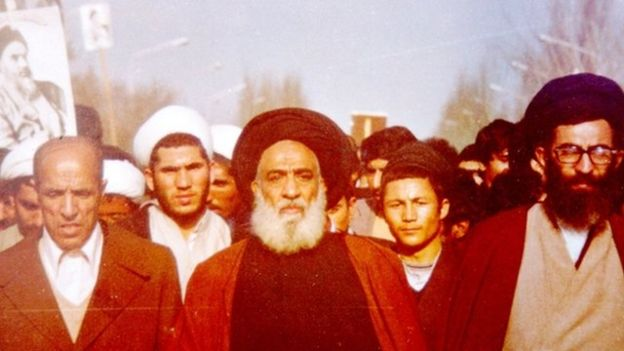
- From left Taher Ahmadzadeh, Kazem Akhavan Mar'ashi, Ali Khamenei in 1979 Iranian Revolution

Governor of Khorasan Province
- In office February 1979 – September 1980
- Prime Minister: Mehdi Bazargan
- Preceded by: Sadegh Amir-Azizi
- Succeeded by: Hassan Ghafourifard

Personal details
- Born: 22 May 1921 Mashhad, Sublime State of Iran
- Died: 30 November 2017 (aged 96) Mashhad, Iran
- Party: Council of Nationalist-Religious Activists of Iran (2000–2017); Freedom Movement of Iran (1961–1980s); National Front (1950s–1961)
- Nickname: Agha Taher (among friends)

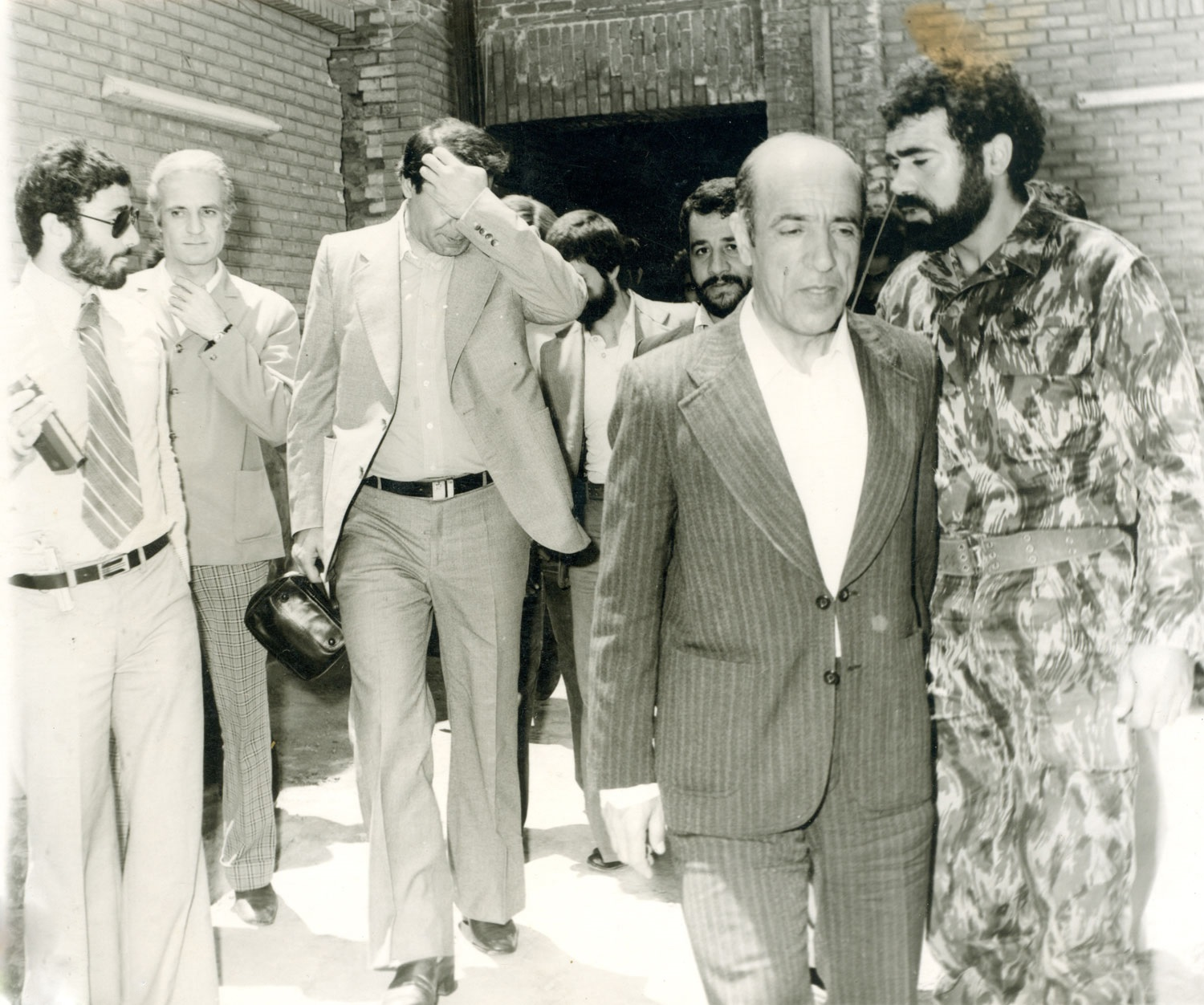
Sadegh Ghotbzadeh and Taher Ahmadzadeh after meeting with Abdullah Musawi Shirazi, Mashhad - 1979

Taher Ahmadzadeh Heravi (Persian: طاهر احمدزاده هروی; 22 May 1921 – 30 November 2017) was an Iranian nationalist-religious political activist who held office as the first governor of Khorasan Province after the Iranian Revolution.

== Early life and education ==
Ahmadzadeh was of Afghan descent. His father was a wealthy Shia from the city of Herat, Afghanistan who migrated to Iran. Ahmadzadeh studied secondary education and was considered a small landowner in his birthplace Mashhad.

== Career ==
Ahmadzadeh was an active opposition to the Pahlavi dynasty since the early 1950s and hailed as the "symbol of heroic resistance against SAVAK", spending 10 years in prison under the regime. Considered a well-known nationalist and a prominent leader in Mashhad, he co-founded a Mossadeghist and religious organization called the 'Center for the Publication of Islamic Truths' along with Mohammad-Taqi Shariati, father of Ali Shariati. He joined National Front's 'National Resistance Movement' in Khorasan after the 1953 coup d'état and served as a member of central committee of its provincial branch, though not affiliated with any particular political party. Working closely with Mehdi Bazargan for almost four decades, he also helped him found the Freedom Movement of Iran.

After the Iranian Revolution in 1979, Bazargan nominated him as the governor of Khorasan province. Ahmadzadeh initially rejected the appointment on the grounds that Ruhollah Khomeini has installed Abbas Vaez-Tabasi as the costudian of Astan Quds Razavi and he should maintain the former position as well. He was ousted soon after resignation of Bazargan. According to Ervand Abrahamian, he was tagged "liberal" and a "sympathizer of the Mojahedin" at the time.

In June 1981, he began to openly criticise the clergy for "monopolising power". Subsequently, Ahmadzadeh was imprisoned in Evin Prison and in 1983 he was forced to confess in a televised program called "roundtable discussions". He was released four years later. Ahmadzadeh was detained again in 2000, when he was 80.

== Personal life ==
His sons Masoud and Majid, as well as his daughter Mastureh were among the leading members of the Organization of Iranian People's Fedai Guerrillas. His youngest son, Mojtaba, was a sympathizer of the People's Mujahedin of Iran and was executed during the 1988 executions of Iranian political prisoners.
