= Fedayeen =

Arabic term for irregular militia troops

Fedayeen (Arabic: فدائيون, romanized: fidāʻiyyūn, lit. 'self-sacrificers', pronounced [fɪ.daːʔɪj.juːn]) (Note: Derives from the word فداء fidāʼ, which means redemption. Literally, someone who redeems himself by risking or sacrificing his life. The pronunciation varies for the first vowel – for example: [fiˈdaːʔ], [fiˈdaːʔi] – hence the transcription difference.) is an Arabic term used to refer to various military groups willing to sacrifice themselves for a larger campaign or leader.

== Etymology ==
"Fidayun" is the plural of "fidayi" (فدائي fidāʻiyy [fɪ.daːʔijj]), meaning 'one who redeems/sacrifices themselves'.

== Medieval usage ==
=== Order of Assassins ===
Hassan-i-Sabbah (c. 1050–1124), who founded the Order of Assassins in Persia and Syria, used the term to refer to his fanatical devotees. Fidāʼīyīn is the plural of fidāʼī, which means "sacrifice". It is widely understood as "those willing to sacrifice themselves for God".

== Modern usage ==
=== Armenia ===
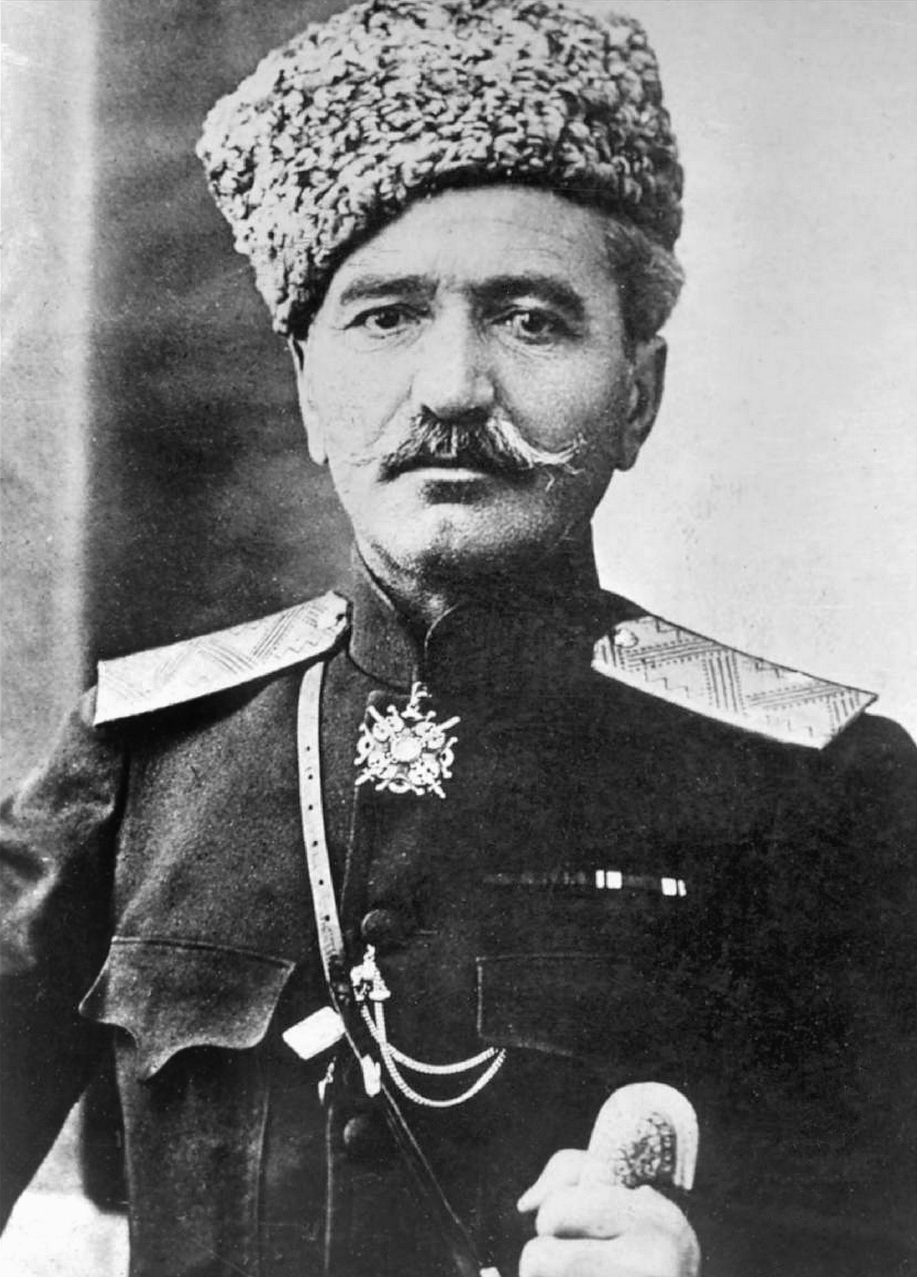
General Andranik Ozanian, wearing his uniform and medals with a papakha hat.

Fedayi also known as the Armenian irregular units or Armenian militia, were Armenian civilians who voluntarily left their families to form self-defense units in reaction to the mass murder of Armenians and the pillage of Armenian villages by criminals, Turkish and Kurdish gangs, Ottoman forces, and Hamidian guards between the 19th and early 20th centuries. Their ultimate goal was to gain Armenian autonomy (Armenakans) or independence (Dashnaks, Hunchaks) depending on their ideology. Some of the key Fedayi figures also participated in the Iranian Constitutional Revolution that commenced during the same period, upon agreement of the ARF leaders.

At the onset of the Nagorno-Karabakh conflict, Armenians of Artsakh began forming small detachments of volunteers and often self-described themselves as Fedayeen, inheriting the name of the fighters who actively resisted the Ottoman Empire in the final decades of the nineteenth and early decades of the twentieth centuries. The Fedayeen during this period worked against attempts by the Ministry of Internal Affairs (MVD) and OMON units of the Azerbaijan SSR to ethnically cleanse the region of Armenians.

The term has also been used to refer to members of the Armenian militant group ASALA.

=== Ottoman Empire and Turkey ===
The Committee of Union and Progress conducted assassination campaigns and called its assassins "fedai", which originated from "feda," deriving from the first letters of "filiyas elenikis desmos anton" meaning "this is the tie of Greek friendship". However, "feda" also means sacrifice in Turkish, representing the term's evolution which came to represent those who swore allegiance to CUP. Within the context of Turkish history, the term fedailer is often associated with the Late Ottoman or Early Republican irregular forces, known as: Kuva-yi Milliye. Those most committed Unionists who would enforce the Central Committee's regime were also known as fedailer.

=== Egypt ===
During the 1940s, groups of Egyptian civilians formed fedayeen groups to contest the British occupation of Egypt, which by then was limited to the region against the Suez Canal. British forces had established numerous military outposts around the canal zone, which many Egyptians viewed as a violation of their national sovereignty. This opposition was not supported by the Egyptian government pre-1951, though these fedayeen groups held broad support among the general public in Egypt.

In 1951, the Egyptian government started supporting the fedyaeen. Attacks "mobs of "irregular self-sacrificers, or fedayeen", some "armed by the Muslim Brotherhood", attacked British military outposts located in the Suez Canal Zone. In the same year, the government started to support the attacks.

=== Eritrea ===
Known by the same name, they operated inside the capital city, Asmara, during the last 15–20 years of the armed struggle in Eritrea against the Ethiopian government. They operated secretly and eliminated people who were considered dangerous to the struggle to gain Eritrean independence, which lasted from 1961 to 1991.

=== Iran ===
Two very different groups used the name Fedayeen in recent Iranian history. The Fadayan-e Islam has been described as "one of the first real Islamic fundamentalist organizations in the Muslim world". It was founded by Navab Safavi in 1946 for the purpose of demanding strict application of the sharia and assassinating those it believed to be apostates and enemies of Islam. After several successful assassinations it was suppressed in 1956 and several leading members were executed.

A Marxist-leaning activist group known as the Fedayeen (Fedayân in Persian language) was founded in 1971 and based in Tehran. Operating between 1971 and 1983, the Fedayeen carried out a number of political assassinations in the course of the struggle against the Shah of Iran, after which the group was suppressed.

In 1979 the Iranian People's Fedâi Guerrillas split from the Organization of Iranian People's Fedaian (Majority).

=== Iraq ===
Beginning in 1995, Iraq established a paramilitary group known as the Fedayeen Saddam, loyal to the Ba'athist Iraqi government of Saddam Hussein. The name was chosen to imply a connection with the Palestinian Fedayeen. In July 2003, personnel records for the Fedayeen organization in Iraq were discovered in the basement of the former Fedayeen headquarters in east Baghdad near the Rasheed Air Base. At the time of the discovery, the Assyrian Democratic Movement occupied the building; after an extensive cataloging process, an operation was conducted in Baghdad resulting in several individuals being detained.

=== Palestine ===
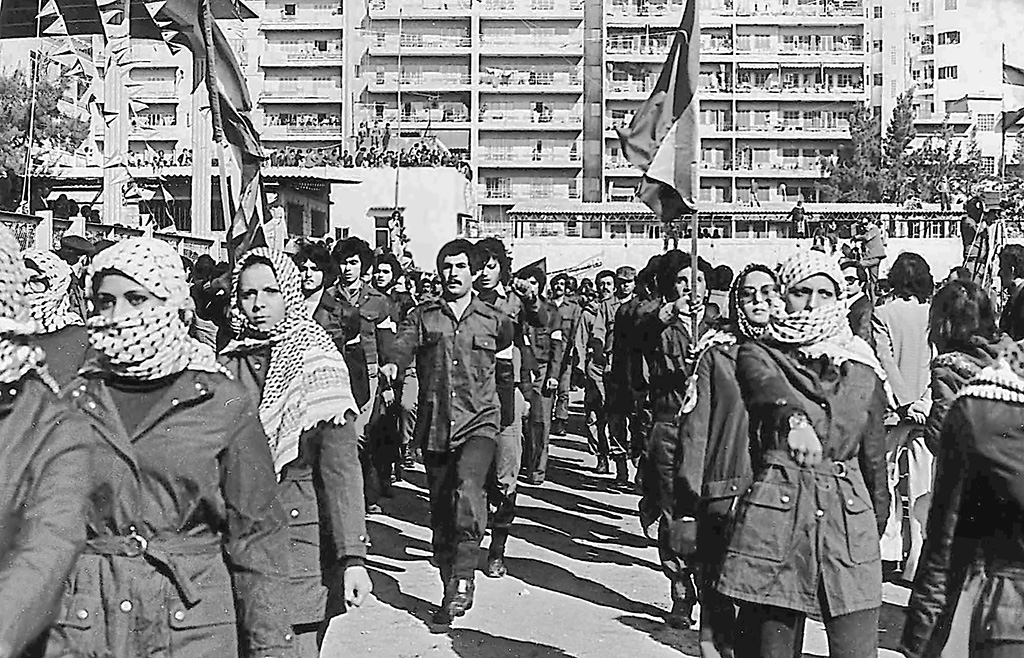
Fedayeen from Fatah in Beirut, Lebanon, 1979

Palestinian fedayeen are militants of a nationalist orientation from among the Palestinian people. The fedayeen made efforts to infiltrate territory in Israel in order to strike military as well as civilian targets in the aftermath of the 1948 Arab–Israeli War. Some groups of fedayeen find their origin among the refugee camps of the aftermath of the 1948 Arab-Israeli War. In these camps the fedayeen would find common cause between each other and the local population, such as in Lebanon. This also enabled them to blend in between the civilians and wage a guerilla war.

Members of these groups were living in the Gaza Strip and the West Bank or in neighboring Lebanon and Syria. The presence of these groups in these countries would however draw attention of the Israeli military which used heavy tactics to flush them out. They also did this in order to turn the civilian population against them, this was successful in the case of south Lebanon.

Prior to Israel's seizure of the West Bank and Gaza Strip in the Six-Day War, these areas, originally destined for a Palestinian state, were under Jordanian and Egyptian occupation, respectively. After Israel's Operation Black Arrow in 1955, the Palestinian fedayeen were incorporated into an Egyptian army unit. In the year 1969 the Cairo Agreement was signed which sanctioned Lebanon an battlefield. This agreement was important since it sanctioned the use of South-Lebanon as a battlefield. Since the area was now a battlefield the Palestinian fedayeen could now use it as base of operations against the Israeli forces.

During this time (1948 – c. 1980), the word entered international usage and was frequently used in the Arab media as a synonym for great militancy. In the Israeli Hebrew press of this time the term was associated with terrorism. Since the mid-1960s and the rise of more organized and specific militant groups, such as the Palestine Liberation Organization, the word has fallen out of usage, but not in the historical context.

=== Lebanon ===
In south Lebanon, after the end of the 1948 Arab-Israeli War, Palestinian refugee camps became operation bases for irregular fedayeen fighters who wanted to strike across the border. In the mid-1960s, early fedayeen units operated clandestinely, relying on local Lebanese peasant guides (fallaheen) to navigate border footpaths and evade the Lebanese Army's Deuxième Bureau. Following the 1967 Six-Day War and the Palestine Liberation Organisation's expulsion from Jordan during Black September in 1970, Lebanon became the primary base for Palestinian armed resistance.

== See also ==
- Arab–Israeli conflict
- Mujahideen
- Palestinian political violence
