= 1982 Amol uprising =

Armed uprising against the Iranian government

Amol uprising
- Part of the consolidation of the Iranian Revolution
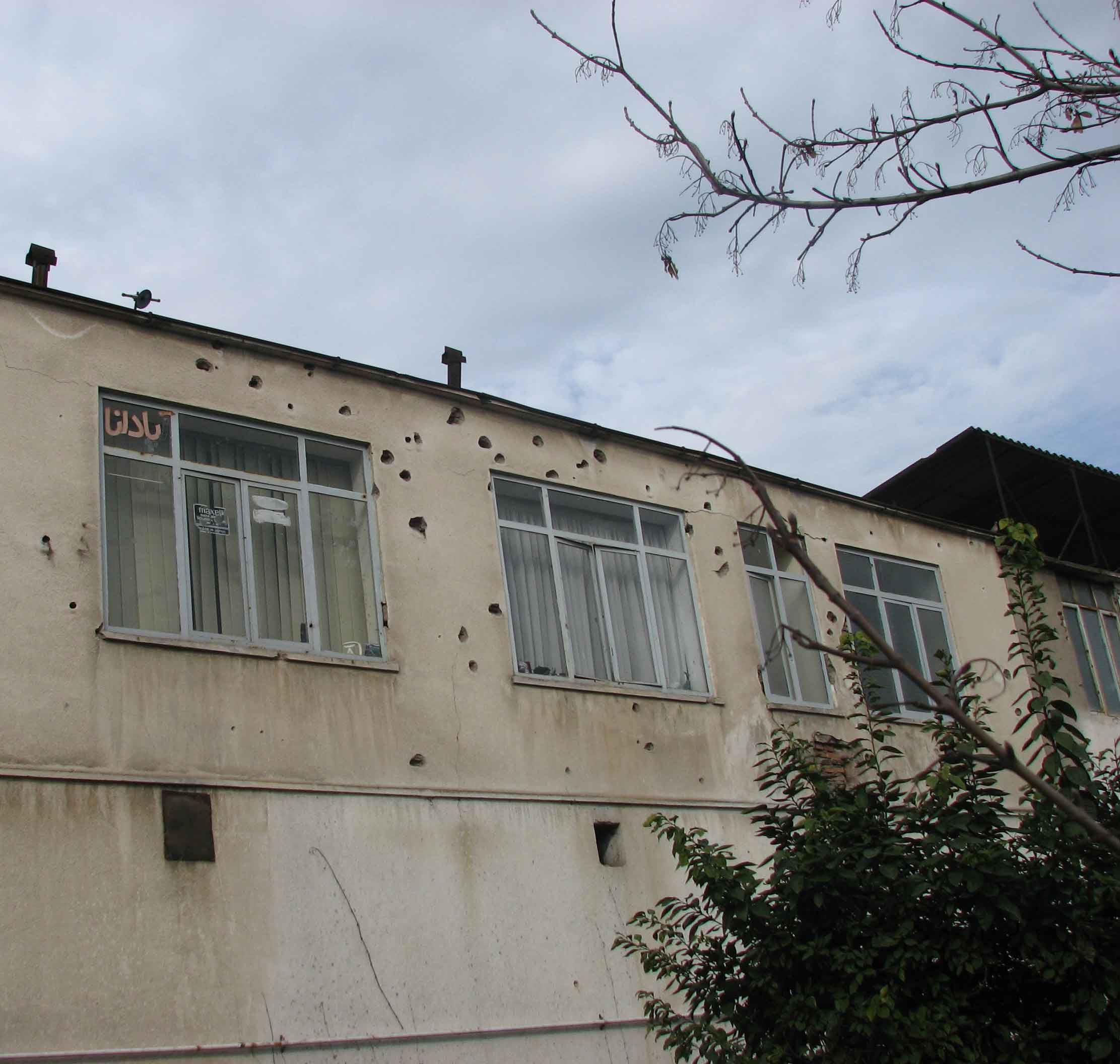
- A building riddled with bullet holes in Amol, 1982
| Date | 25 January 1982 |
| Location | Amol County, Iran |
| Result | Iranian government victory |

Belligerents
| Iran | Union of Iranian Communists |

Commanders and leaders
| Nasser Shabani | Kak Ismail (executed) |

Strength
| Unknown | ~100 |

Casualties and losses
| 40–200 killed | 40–100 killed |

The 1982 Amol uprising was an armed uprising against the government of Iran by the Maoist organisation Union of Iranian Communists (Sarbedaran).

== Background ==
With the death of 100 Tabari soldiers, Iranian forces and pro-Iranian Tabari mercenaries entered the city of Amol, and the uprising was finally defeated. The government forces buried the bodies of 100 Tabari men and women in an unknown location. The group's leader, who was wounded in the war, was captured by government forces and eventually executed in 1984.

== History ==
1982 was an important year in the history of the UIC(S) and the history of Maoism in Iran in general. In this year the UIC(S) mobilised forces in forests around Amol and launched an armed campaign against the Islamic Republic. It organised an uprising on 25 January 1982, led by Siamak Zaim. The uprising was eventually a failure and many UIC(S) and Maoist leaders were shot. Zaim was arrested by the Revolutionary Guard after they retook Amol by force, and eventually executed in 1984 in spite of a pardon from death granted for helping end the firefight.

== Aftermath ==
After the failure of the uprising the UIC(S) went through a difficult period with most of its leadership and members arrested or killed. It also experienced various theoretical and political crises.

== In culture ==
The Little Black Fish (Persian: ماهی سیاه کوچولو) is a 2014 Iranian film by Majid Esmaeili Parsa about Amol uprising.

== See also ==
- KDPI insurgency (1989–1996)
- Iraqi Partisan movement, 1979–1988
- Maoist insurgency in Turkey
