= Organizations of the Iranian Revolution =

Several organizations, parties and guerrilla groups were involved in the Iranian Revolution. Some were part of Ayatollah Khomeini's network and supported the theocratic Islamic Republic movement, while others did not and were suppressed when Khomeini took power. Some groups were created after the fall of the Pahlavi dynasty and still exist, while others helped overthrow the Shah but no longer exist or have become exiled.

== Prerevolutionary opposition groups ==
Before the Iranian Revolution, opposition groups tended to fall into four major categories: Constitutionalist, Leftist, and Islamist.

Constitutionalists, including the National Front of Iran, wanted to revive constitutional monarchy including free elections. Without elections or outlets for peaceful political activity though, they had lost their relevance and had little following.

Marxist groups were primarily guerrilla groups working to defeat the Pahlavi regime by assassination and armed struggle. They were illegal and heavily suppressed by the SAVAK internal security apparatus. They included the Tudeh Party of Iran; the Organization of Iranian People's Fedai Guerrillas (OIPFG) and the breakaway Iranian People's Fedai Guerrillas (IPFG), two armed organizations; and some minor groups.

Islamists were divided into several groups. The Freedom Movement of Iran was formed by religious members of the National Front of Iran. It also was a constitutional group and wanted to use lawful political methods against the Shah. This movement comprised Bazargan and Taleqani.

One leftist political party with a considerable following was the People's Mojahedin Organization of Iran (PMOI). The organization opposed the influence of the clergy and later fought the Islamic government. Although the Mojahedin professed loyalty to Islam, they rejected the doctrine of velayat-e Faqih, condemning it as a “reactionary” system of governance. In its place, they advocated for an idealistic model of council-based government, articulated through concepts such as “council politics” (shora-ha) and the vision of a “classless monotheistic society” (jameh-e bi-tabagh-e tohidī). Individual writers and speakers like Ali Shariati and Morteza Motahhari also did important work outside of these parties and groups.

The Islamist groups that ultimately prevailed were the loyal followers of Ayatollah Khomeini. They included some minor armed Islamist groups which joined together after the revolution in the Mojahedin of the Islamic Revolution Organization. The Coalition of Islamic Societies was founded by religious bazaaris (traditional merchants). The Combatant Clergy Association comprised Motahhari, Ayatollah Mohammad Beheshti, Mohammad-Javad Bahonar, Akbar Hashemi Rafsanjani and Mofatteh who later became the major governors of Islamic Republic. They used a cultural approach to fight the Shah.

Because of internal repression, opposition groups abroad were used and important to keep the revolution alive. Such groups include the Confederation of Iranian Students, the foreign branch of the Freedom Movement of Iran and the Islamic Association of Students.

== Khomeinist revolutionary groups and bodies ==
=== Revolutionary Council ===
The "Revolutionary Council" was formed on 12 January 1979 by Khomeini to manage the revolution. Its existence was kept a secret during the early, less secure times of the revolution. Rafsanjani says Ayatollah Khomeini chose Beheshti, Motahhari, Rafsanjani, Bahonar and Musavi Ardabili as members. These invited others to serve: Bazargan, Taleqani, Ali Khamenei, Banisadr, Mahdavi Kani, Yadollah Sahabi, Katirayee, Ahmad Sadr Haj Seyed Javadi, Qarani and Ali Asqr Masoodi. This council suggested Mahdi Bazargan as the prime minister of the temporary government of Khomeini, and he accepted it.

After the revolution took power, the council became a legislative body issuing decrees until the formation of first parliament on 12 August 1980. The laws passed by this council were recognized as legitimate in the Islamic republic of Iran.

=== The Provisional Revolutionary Government ===
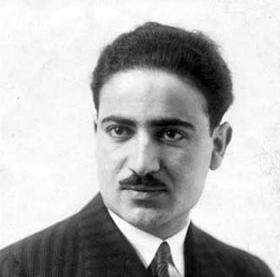
Iranian prime minister Mehdi Bazargan was an advocate of democracy and civil rights. He also opposed the cultural revolution and US embassy takeover.

The Provisional Revolutionary Government or "Interim Government of Iran" (1979–1980) was the first government established in Iran following the overthrow of the monarchy. It was formed by order of Ayatollah Khomeini on February 4, 1979, while Shapour Bakhtiar (the Shah's last Prime Minister) was still claiming power.

Ayatollah Khomeini appointed Bazargan as the prime minister of "The Provisional Revolutionary Government" on February 4, 1979. According to his commandment:

"Mr. Engineer Bazargan, Based on the proposal of the Revolutionary Council, in accordance with the sharia based rights and legal rights which are both originated from the decisive and closely unanimous votes of Iranian nation for leadership of the movement, which in turn has been expressed in the vast gatherings and wide and numerous demonstrations throughout Iran and by virtue of my trust on your firm belief in the holy tenets of Islam ... I appoint you the authority to establish the interim government ... for the formation of a temporary government to arrange the affairs of the country and especially a national referendum vote about turning the country into an Islamic republic, ... All public offices, the army, and citizens shall furnish their utmost cooperation with your interim government so as to attain the high and holy goals of this Islamic revolution and to restore order and function to the affairs of the nation. I pray to God for the success of you and your interim government at this sensitive juncture of our nation's history.’’ Ruhollah Al-Musavi al-Khomeini

Elaborating further on his decree, Khomeini made it clear Iranians were commanded to obey Bazargan and that this was a religious duty.

As a man who, though the guardianship [Velayat] that I have from the holy lawgiver [the Prophet], I hereby pronounce Bazargan as the Ruler, and since I have appointed him, he must be obeyed. The nation must obey him. This is not an ordinary government. It is a government based on the sharia. Opposing this government means opposing the sharia of Islam ... Revolt against God's government is a revolt against God. Revolt against God is blasphemy.

Mehdi Bazargan introduced his 7-member cabinet on February 14, 1979, three days after victory day when the army announced its neutrality in conflicts between Khomeini's and Bakhtiar's supporters. Bakhtiar resigned on the same day, February 11.

The PRG is often described as "subordinate" to the Revolutionary Council, and having had difficulties reigning in the numerous komitehs which were competing with its authority

Prime Minister Bazargan resigned and his government fell after American Embassy officials were taken hostage on November 4, 1979. Power then passed into the hands of the Revolutionary Council. Bazargan had been a supporter of the original revolutionary draft constitution rather than theocracy by Islamic jurist, and his resignation was received by Khomeini without complaint, saying "Mr. Bazargan ... was a little tired and preferred to stay on the sidelines for a while." Khomeini later described his appointment of Bazargan as a "mistake."

=== The Committees of Islamic Revolution ===
The first komitehs "sprang up everywhere" as autonomous organizations in late 1978. Organized in mosques, schools and workplaces, they mobilized people, organized strikes and demonstrations, and distributed scarce commodities. After February 12, many of the 300,000 rifles and sub-machine guns seized from military arsenals ended up with the committees who confiscated property and arrested those they believed to be counter-revolutionaries. In Tehran alone there were 1500 committees. Inevitably there was conflict between the committees and the other sources of authority, particularly the Provisional Government.

To deal with this, on February 12, the committees of the Islamic revolution were charged with gathering weapons, organizing the armed revolutionaries, and generally fighting chaos in the wake of the collapse of the police and weakness of the army. Khomeini put Ayatollah Mahdavi Kani in charge of the komiteh. They also served as "the eyes and ears" of the new regime, and are credited by critics with "many arbitrary arrests, executions and confiscations of property". In the summer of 1979, the komitehs were purged to eradicate the influence of the leftist guerrilla movements that had infiltrated them. In 1991 they were merged with the conventional police in a new organisation known as the Niruha-ye Entezami (Forces of Order).

=== Islamic Republic Party ===
The Islamic Republic Party was started by Khomeini lieutenant Seyyed Mohammad Hosseini Beheshti and the Coalition of Islamic Societies within a few days of Khomeini's arrival in Iran. It was made up of the Mojahedin of the Islamic Revolution (OMIR), merchants of the bazaar and "a large segment of the politically active clergy." It "operated on every level of society, from government offices to almost all city quarters..." and worked to establish theocratic government by velayat-e faqih in Iran outmaneuvering opponents and wielding power on the street through the Hezbollah.

The party achieved a large majority in the first parliament but clashed with first president, Banisadr, who was not a member of the party. Banisadr supporters were suppressed and Banisadr impeached and removed from office June 21, 1981. The 20 June 1981 Iranian protests followed, which was a one-day anti–Islamic Republic protest organized by the People's Mujahedin of Iran in various Iranian cities in response to the impeachment of the then president Banisadr. This marked the beginning of the 1981–1982 Iran Massacres led by the Islamic government. The victims included intellectuals, scientists, artists, socialists, social democrats, members and sympathizers of Mujahedin-e-Khalq, nationalists, liberals, monarchists, ethnic minorities, and followers of religious minorities such as the Bahá'í Faith. On the 28 June 1981, a bombing of the office of the Islamic Republic Party resulted in the death of around 70 high-ranking officials, cabinet members and members of parliament, including Mohammad Beheshti, the secretary-general of the party and head of the Islamic Party's judicial system. Mohammad-Javad Bahonar then became the secretary-general of the party, but was in turn assassinated on 30 August 1981. Because of these events and other assassinations, the Islamic Party was weakened, eventually dissolving by 1987.

=== Islamic Revolutionary Guard Corps ===
The Revolutionary Guard or Pasdaran-e Enqelab, was established by a decree issued by Khomeini on May 5, 1979 "to protect the revolution from destructive forces and counter-revolutionaries," i.e., as a counterweight both to the armed groups of the left, and to the Iranian military, which had been part of the Shah's power base. 6,000 persons were initially enlisted and trained, but the guard eventually grew into "a full-scale" military force "with air force and navy branches". Its work involves both conventional military duties, helping Islamic forces abroad, such as Hezbollah in Lebanon, and internal security, such as the suppression of narcotics trafficking, riots by the discontented, and unIslamic behavior by members of the public. It has been described as "without a doubt the strongest institution of the revolution"

=== Basij ===
"Oppressed mobilization" or Baseej-e Mostaz'afin was founded at the command of Khomeini in 1980, to be organized by the Revolutionary Guard. Its purpose was to mobilize volunteers of many skills — doctors, engineers, but primarily to mobilize those too old or young to serve in other bodies. Basij (also Baseej) often provided security, and helped police and the army. Baseej were also used to attack opposition demonstrators and ransack opposition newspaper offices, who were believed to be enemies of the revolution.

=== Hezbollahi ===
The Hezbollahi, or members of the Party of God, were the "strong-arm thugs" who attacked demonstrators and offices of newspapers critical of Khomeini, and later a wider variety of activities found to be undesirable for "moral" or "cultural" reasons. Hezbollah is/was not a tightly structured independent organisation but more a movement of loosely bound groups usually centered around a mosque. Although in the early days of the revolution Khomeinists—those in the Islamic Republican Party—denied connection to Hezbollah, maintaining its attacks were the spontaneous will of the people over which the government had no control, in fact Hezbollah was supervised by "a young protegee of Khomeini," Hojjat al-Islam Hadi Ghaffari.

=== Assembly of Experts of Constitution ===
The seventy-three-member Assembly of Experts for Constitution was elected in the summer of 1979 to write a new constitution for the Islamic Republic. The Assembly was originally conceived of as a way expediting the draft constitution which Khomeini supporters had started working when Khomeini was still in exile, but which leftists found too conservative and wanted to make major changes to. Ironically, it was the Assembly that made major changes, instituting principles of theocracy by velayat-e faqih, adding on a faqih Supreme Leader, and increasing the power and clerical character of the Council of Guardians which could veto un-Islamic legislation. The new constitution was opposed by some clerics, including Ayatollah Shariatmadari, and secularists who urged a boycott. It was approved by referendum on December 2 and 3, 1979, by over 98 percent of the vote.

== Post-revolutionary parties and movements ==
=== Muslim Student Followers of the Imam's Line ===
Muslim Student Followers of the Imam's Line was a group of student supporters of Khomeini that occupied the U.S. embassy in Tehran on 4 November 1979 after the ex-Shah of Iran was admitted to the United States for cancer treatment. Although the students later said they did not expect to occupy the embassy for long, their action received official support and triggered the Iran hostage crisis where 52 American diplomats were held hostage for 444 days.

=== Ansar-e Hezbollah ===
Ansar-e-Hezbollah (Arabic: أنصار حزب الله, Persian: انصار حزب‌الله) is a militant ultraconservative Islamist group in Iran. Along with the Basij, they are said to "represent a key element of the Islamic Republic's hold on power, its use of violent repression" of dissident gatherings. Its ideology revolves around devotion to Grand Ayatollah Ruhollah Khomeini and his belief in Valiyat al-faqih and elimination of foreign non-Islamic influences.

== See also ==
- The Interim Government of Iran
- Background and causes of the Iranian Revolution
- Guerrilla groups of Iran
