= Mehrnoosh Ebrahimi =

Iranian female doctor and guerrilla

Mehrnoosh Ebrahimi مهرنوش ابراهیمی
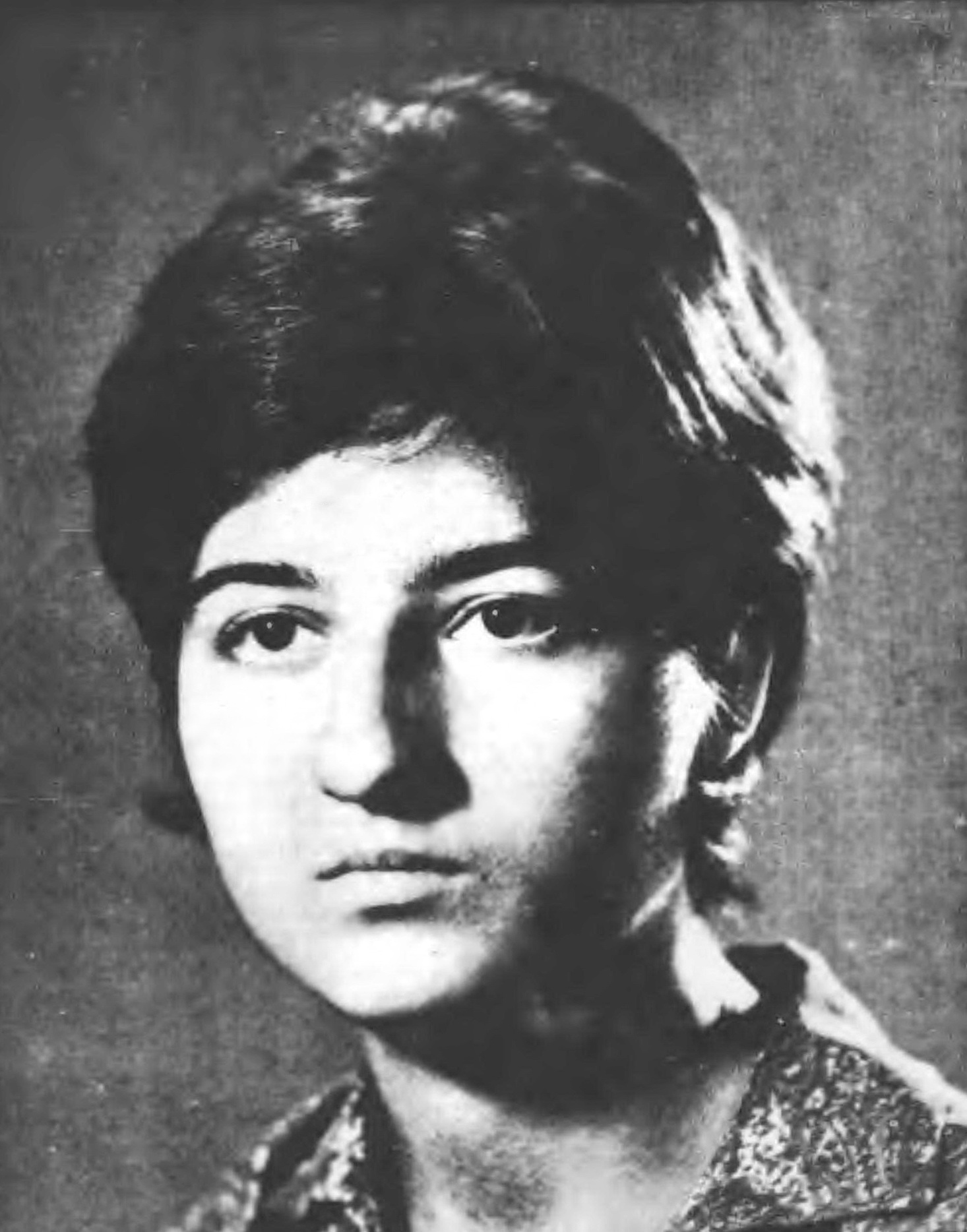
- Born: September 27, 1947; Tehran
- Died: October 1, 1971 (aged 24); Tehran
- Cause of death: Injury during armed conflict
- Education: medical
- Alma mater: University of Tehran
- Occupations: Medical student and guerrilla
- Organization: Organization of Iranian People's Fedai Guerrillas
- Known for: She is renowned as the first female Fedayee Guerrilla to be killed in an armed conflict.

Mehrnoosh Ebrahimi (Persian: مهرنوش ابراهیمی; September 27, 1947 - October 1, 1971) was an Iranian left-wing political activist and a member of the Organization of Iranian People's Fedai Guerrillas. She is renowned as the first female Fedayee Guerrilla to be killed in an armed conflict.

== Background ==
Mehrnoosh Ebrahimi was born in Tehran in 1947. She pursued her education and enrolled in the Faculty of Medicine at Tehran University. She later ventured into practicing medicine alongside her husband, Cengiz Qobadi, who also graduated from Tehran University's medical program. The couple devoted themselves to providing medical aid in remote areas, notably in Savadkuh.

With the inception of the People's Fedayee Guerrillas Organization, Mehrnoosh Ebrahimi assumed a pivotal role as a member of the village operations procurement team.

While conducting investigations in Sisangan Forest Park fa alongside Cengiz Ghobadi and several others to identify potential warehouses, they were apprehended. Although they were initially captured, Mehrnoosh and her husband managed to evade their captors separately, whereas the other two members were apprehended and wounded during their attempted escape.

Mehrnoosh Ebrahimi tragically lost her life on October 1, 1971, during an armed confrontation with SAVAK forces in Tehran. Her husband had met a similar fate just a day prior in another conflict.
