= Farrokh Negahdar =

Iranian politician

- فرخ نگهدار
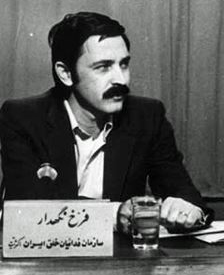
- Negahdar in 1980
- Born: 5 November 1946 (age 79)
- Education: University of London; University of Tehran
- Political party: URI (2004–present); OIPFM (1980–present); OIPFG (1963–1980)
- Website: negahdar.info

Farrokh Negahdar (Persian: فرخ‌ نگهدار, romanized: Farroḵ Negahdār; born 1946) is an Iranian leftist political activist.

Born into a civil servant family, Negahdar joined the Organization of Iranian People's Fedai Guerrillas in 1963, and began studying at University of Tehran in 1965. Two years later he was arrested by SAVAK for his activities with Bijan Jazani, and released in 1968, being rearrested and confined until 1977. He became a member of central cadre in 1978 and led the organization's majority faction. After the Iranian Revolution, he was a member of both central and executive committees. Before the split in the party, he was elected as secretary of the central council. On 17 June 1982, he was unanimously elected as the first-secretary of the Organization of Iranian People's Fedaian (Majority).

Party political offices
New title	First Secretary of the Organization of Iranian People's Fedaian (Majority); 1982–1990	Unknown
New title	Secretary of the Central Committee of Organization of Iranian People's Fedai Guerrillas; 1979–1980	Vacant Organization dissolved
