= People's Democratic Front (Iran) =

The People's Democratic Front (Persian: جبهه دموکراتیک خلق) was an Iranian rebel group, which advocated armed struggle against the regime of Mohammad Reza Pahlavi. Prominent members of the group included Nader Shaygan-shamasbi, Marzieh Ahmadi-osku'i and Mostafa Shoa'ian. In June 1973 the organization merged into the Organization of Iranian People's Fedai Guerrillas.

Ideological differences had existed between the People's Democratic Front and OIPFG. Shaygan and Shoa'ian opposed Leninism, which they saw as a deviation from Marxism. In 1974 Shoa'ian was expelled from OIPFG (by this time Shaygan was dead). After Shoa'ian's expulsion, other former People's Democratic Front cadres upheld the line of OIPFG.
