= Organization of Communist Revolutionaries (Marxist–Leninist) =

- Leader: Ḥamīd Kawṯarī, Sīāmak Zaʿīm, and Fereydūn ʿAlīābādī
- Founded: 1969
- Dissolved: 1976
- Merged into: UICS
- Ideology: Communism; Marxism–Leninism; Maoism
- Political position: Far-left

Organization of Communist Revolutionaries (Marxist–Leninist) (Persian: (سازمان انقلابیون کمونیست (م-ل, romanized: Sāzmān-e enqelābīyūn-e komūnīst) was an Iranian Maoist organization. It was formed in opposition to the Shah regime in Iran.

OCR(M-L) was founded in 1970 and it advocated against policies of Nikita Khrushchev, describing them as 'Khrushchevian Revisionism'. Instead it supported Mao Zedong and his strategy of People’s war and Cultural Revolution in China. They adopted program that claimed that the ideology of the working class was 'Marxism-Leninism-Mao Zedong Thought'.

Later in 1976, OCR(M-L) merged with the 'Pooya Group', forming the Union of Iranian Communists (Sarbedaran). OCR(M-L) is regarded as an early part of the current Communist Party of Iran (Marxist-Leninist-Maoist).
