= Amir Parviz Pooyan =

Iranian theoretician and revolutionary guerrilla (1946–1971)

Amir Parviz Pouyan (Persian: امیرپرویز پویان, ['Amīr Parvīz-è Puyān]; born 16 September 1946 – 24 May 1971) was an Iranian theoretician, a revolutionary guerrilla, a Communist organizer and founder of the Organization of Iranian People's Fedai Guerrillas in Iran. On 24 May 1971, Pouyan was killed during an armed action when he and his companion Rahmatullah Piro Naziri came under fire by the SAVAK for their participation in revolutionary guerrilla activities.
