= Worker's Way =

The Labourer's Creed
- Founded: 1978; 48 years ago
- Headquarters: Frankfurt am Main, Germany
- Newspaper: Rāh-e Kārgar
- Ideology: Communism; Marxism-Leninism
- Political position: Far-left
- National affiliation: Cooperation Council of Left and Communist Parties

Website
- rahkargar.com

The Labourer's Creed (Persian: راه کارگر, romanized: Rāh-e Kārgar) is an Iranian Marxist-Leninist political organization formed in 1978, by former affiliates of other leftist groups. It is currently exiled in Germany.

This Organization firstly established with the name Labourer’s Creed (Persian: راه کارگر, romanized: Rāh-e Kārgar) in 1979, but in 1982 changed its name to Organization of Revolutionary Workers of Iran – The Labourer’s Creed (O.R.W.I; Persian: سازمان کارگران انقلابی ايران – راه کارگر, romanized: Sazman-e Kargâran Anqlâbi-ye Iran-Rāh-e kārgar). However, it has once again used its previous name, Labourer’s Creed (Persian: راه کارگر, romanized: Rāh-e Kārgar) since 2008, because of the occurrence of a split in the organization in 2008 and separation of a group of members who called themselves the Executive Board of the Revolutionary Workers Organization of Iran (Rāh-e Kārgar).

The organization was critical of other leftist groups, including Tudeh Party, factions of People's Fedai Guerrillas and Peykar. However, it did not have a broad power base like its leftist rivals.

It considered the post-revolution establishment a "fascist" regime while respecting the clergy for its ability to mobilize the masses. In 1981, some of the leading members were executed, including Ali-Reza Shokouhi, Hossein Qazi, and Mahdi Khosroshahi.
