= Organization of Iranian People's Fedai Guerrillas – Followers of the Identity Platform =

Organisation of Iranian People's Fedai Guerrillas (Followers of the Identity Platform)
- Leader: Mehdi Sāmeʿ
- Founded: 1983; 43 years ago
- Split from: Organization of Iranian People's Fedai Guerrillas (Minority)
- Headquarters: Europe
- National affiliation: National Council of Resistance of Iran

Organization of Iranian People's Fedai Guerrillas – Followers of the Identity Platform (Persian: سازمان چریک‌های فدایی خلق ایران – پیرو برنامه هویت) is an Iranian opposition group, based in exile. It was formed in 1983, as a split from the Organization of Iranian People's Fedai Guerrillas (Minority).

== See also ==
- Organization of Iranian People's Fedai Guerrillas (1963–1980)
  - Iranian People's Fedai Guerrillas (1979–present)
  - Organization of Iranian People's Fedaian (Majority) (1980–present)
    - Organization of Iranian People's Fedai Guerrillas – Majority Left Wing (1980–1982)
  - Organization of Iranian People's Fedai Guerrillas (Minority) (1980–1987)
    - Organization of Iranian People's Fedai Guerrillas – Followers of the Identity Platform (1983–present)
    - Organization of Iranian People's Fedai Guerrillas (1985–present)
    - Fedaian Organisation (Minority) (1987–present)
