= Organization of Iranian People's Fedai Guerrillas (1985) =

Organisation of Iranian People's Fedai Guerrillas
- Leader: Ḥosayn Zohari
- Founded: 1985
- Split from: Organization of Iranian People's Fedai Guerrillas (Minority)
- Headquarters: Europe
- Ideology: Marxism-Leninism

Organization of Iranian People's Fedaii Guerrillas (Persian: سازمان چریک‌های فدایی خلق ایران) is an Iranian communist group. It was formed in 1985, as a split from the Organization of Iranian People's Fedai Guerrillas (Minority). The organization is currently banned in Iran.

== See also ==
- Organization of Iranian People's Fedai Guerrillas (1963–1980)
  - Iranian People's Fedai Guerrillas (1979–present)
  - Organization of Iranian People's Fedaian (Majority) (1980–present)
    - Organization of Iranian People's Fedai Guerrillas – Majority Left Wing (1980–1982)
  - Organization of Iranian People's Fedai Guerrillas (Minority) (1980–1987)
    - Organization of Iranian People's Fedai Guerrillas – Followers of the Identity Platform (1983–present)
    - Organization of Iranian People's Fedai Guerrillas (1985–present)
    - Fedaian Organisation (Minority) (1987–present)
