= Ashraf Dehghani =

Iranian Communist revolutionary (born 1949)

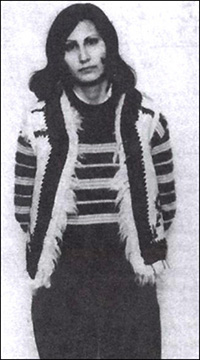
- Dehghani c. 1970s
- Born: 1949 (age 76–77); Azarbaijan Province, Imperial State of Iran
- Political party: Organization of Iranian People's Fedai Guerrillas (1971–1979); Iranian People's Fedai Guerrillas (1979–present)
- Movement: Communism, feminism
- Opponents: Imperial State of Iran (1971–1979); Islamic Republic of Iran (1979–present)

Ashraf Dehghani (Persian: اشرف دهقانی; born 1949) is an Iranian communist revolutionary, best known as the leader of the Iranian People's Fedai Guerrillas (IPFG). Exposed to progressive politics from an early age, along with her brother, Dehghani joined the Organization of Iranian People's Fedai Guerrillas (OIPFG), becoming the only woman on its central committee.

In 1971, not long after the OIPFG initiated its armed struggle against the Imperial State, Dehghani was arrested and imprisoned by the SAVAK. In prison, Dehghani was regularly subjected to torture and rape, which she later detailed in her memoirs. Time in prison strengthened her belief in historical materialism and developed her perspective on anti-authoritarianism and feminism. In 1973, she escaped prison and rejoined the OIPFG, becoming the leading figure in its ultra-left faction after the Iranian Revolution. While the majority of the OIPFG moved away from armed struggle and accepted the authority of the new Islamic Republic of Iran, Dehghani continued to advocate for guerrilla warfare against the new government. In 1979, together with a minority of OIPFG members, she split off and formed the Iranian People's Fedai Guerrillas (IPFG), which continued to fight against the government. After the suppression of the 1979 Kurdish rebellion in Iran, Dehghani and her faction fled the country to Europe, where she is presumed to be living clandestinely.

== Biography ==
=== Early life ===
In 1949, Ashraf Dehghani was born into a working-class family in Iranian Azerbaijan. She was brought up in a politically progressive household, where from an early age, her parents told her stories of the short-lived Azerbaijan People's Government. In school, she developed a reputation as a political agitator, being reported to the SAVAK by her own teacher for writing an essay that criticised the Imperial State. After graduating from school, she became a teacher in a poor Azeri village.

Although she had promised the SAVAK that she would cease political activities, she continued her political agitation under the wing of her older brother Behrouz and his friend, the Iranian social critic Samad Behrangi. During the late 1960s, Dehghani joined her brother in the Organization of Iranian People's Fedai Guerrillas (OIPFG), becoming the only woman on its Central Committee.

=== Imprisonment ===
On 8 February 1970, the OIPFG launched its first attack against the Imperial State, with an assault against the gendarmerie at Siahkal. In the wake of the attack, revolutionary actions surged in Iran, to which the SAVAK responded with violent repression. Dehghani herself continued her activities, and on 13 May 1971, she was arrested by the SAVAK and sentenced to ten years in prison. During her time in Evin Prison, she reported to have been regularly tortured and raped by the SAVAK. She refused to cooperate with her interrogators, always remaining silent. On one occasion, they attempted to torture her by releasing a snake onto her body, expecting her to be frightened, but this elicited no reaction from her. She later concluded of the experience that her torturers believed women to be weak, "but they didn't understand why and what type of women are weak."

Throughout her sentence, she held to her historical materialist belief in the inevitability of social revolution. She also developed an analysis of the Imperial State's authoritarianism, concluding that the system was inherently weak as it couldn't suppress dissent even through torture. She also noted the class discrimination with which the SAVAK treated women of different social classes — sex workers were abused by the guards, while upper-class dissidents received fully-furnished private cells — and reported the hatred that imprisoned women displayed for Ashraf Pahlavi during her visit. While she concluded that working-class women were "dually exploited", she also suggested that women that had attained class consciousness needed class conscious male partners, in order to build a classless society together. Dehghani thus contrasted "reactionary women" against "human beings", claiming the latter to be women engaged in class struggle with the aim of achieving freedom and social equality.

On 13 March 1973, she escaped prison dressed in a chador and returned to work with the OIPFG. Her memoirs of her struggles in prison, Torture and Resistance In Iran, were published the following year in London and banned from publication in Iran until the outbreak of the Iranian Revolution. Having fled the country after her prison escape, Dehghani remained in exile until the Revolution broke out. During the subsequent period, her exact whereabouts were unknown.

=== Post-revolutionary activities ===
Following the Revolution, the Tudeh Party and the majority of OIPFG members deviated from the program of armed struggle, claiming the tactic to be outdated and accusing its proponents of ultra-leftism. Dehghani was one of the OIPFG leaders that continued to advocate for guerrilla warfare. She was expelled from the OIPFG over the issue. She in turn denounced the OIPFG's new leadership for revisionism and anti-communism, accusing them of having abandoned the organisation's political prisoners. She considered the Khomeini government to have constituted a new bourgeois regime, little different from the Shah. She thus felt that armed struggle was still a valid tactic, in order to prepare the masses for a social revolution and to build resistance to imperialist intervention in the country.

Dehghani led a minority of the organisation's members away and established the Iranian People's Fedai Guerrillas (IPFG), which committed itself to continued armed struggle against the new Iranian government. At the time, the IPFG was the only revolutionary organisation in which women served on the central committee. Although the government understood the IPFG and OIPFG to be separate, the IPFG's continued advocacy of armed struggle was used as pretext to suppress both, with their centres being raided by Khomeinists.

When the 1979 Kurdish rebellion broke out, Dehghani's faction decided to join it, declaring their support for the Kurdistan Democratic Party (KDP) and fighting alongside them against the Islamic Revolutionary Guard Corps (IRGC). In June 1981, the IPFG and KDP were joined by the People's Mojahedin Organisation (MEK), who had decided to take up armed struggle against the Islamic Republic. After the MEK, Dehghani's IPFG would become one of the most effective guerrilla groups. IPFG members accounted for 20% of arrests and executions by the authorities.

By July 1981, the MEK and IPFG were facing harsh repression by the authorities. Many of the group's leading members were killed and factional disputes broke out within its nucleus in Kurdistan, causing it to lose hundreds of supporters over the subsequent years. This would eventually lead to the group's effective elimination, with its surviving members fleeing to Europe. Little is known of Dehghani's life after this point, although as of 2007, she was believed to be living clandestinely in Germany.

== Legacy ==
In her memoirs, Dehghani depicted her experiences with torture by the SAVAK and provided an analysis of Iranian politics. In the introduction to her autobiography, her "heroic resistance" was held up by the IPFG as "an example of [the] courage and determination of the Iranian revolutionaries." Hamideh Sedghi later said of Dehghani: "Iranian scholars and feminists alike have largely ignored Dehghani’s tale. She had a unique life and experiences: she was a non-conformist, militant, and defiant political actor."

Dehghani was a mentor to fellow OIPFG member Roghieh Daneshgari, who described her as a "courageous fighter" against the Imperial State. Dehghani's feminism provided an inspiration for Iranian feminists, with a number of women's organisations that were established during the Iranian Revolution taking up a number of her ideas. Historian Haideh Moghissi has characterised Dehghani's view on feminism as one that "explicitly accepts women’s weakness". Dehghani's guerrilla tactics ultimately proved to be a model that couldn't be followed by most women, mostly providing an image of guerrilla women for inspiration.

== Bibliography ==
- Moghadam, Val; Ashtiani, Ali (1991). "The Left and revolution in Iran". Race & Class. 33 (1): 86–91. doi:10.1177/030639689103300106. ISSN 0306-3968. S2CID 144928159.
- Moghadam, Valentine M. (December 2019). "Revolutions and Women's Rights: The Iranian Revolution in Comparative Perspective". In Stenberg, Leif; Savant, Sarah (eds.). 40 Years On: Reflections on the Iranian Revolution. Abdou Filali-Ansary Occasional Paper Series. Vol. 1. Aga Khan University. pp. 8–11. ISSN 2633-8890 – via Academia.edu.
- Moghissi, Haideh (1996) [1994]. "The Fedayeen and Women's Struggle". Populism and Feminism in Iran. Macmillan Press. pp. 107–138. doi:10.1007/978-1-349-25233-6_7. ISBN 978-0-333-67412-3.
- Sedghi, Hamideh (2007). "Women and the State". Women and Politics in Iran: Veiling, Unveiling, and Reveiling. Cambridge University Press. pp. 152–196. doi:10.1017/CBO9780511510380. ISBN 978-0-521-83581-7.
- Shahidian, Hammed (1997). "Women and Clandestine Politics in Iran, 1970-1985". Feminist Studies. 23 (1): 7–42. doi:10.2307/3178296. hdl:2027/spo.0499697.0023.103. JSTOR 3178296.
- Tohidi, Nayereh (1991). "Gender and Islamic Fundamentalism: Feminist Politics in Iran". In Mohanty, Chandra Talpade; Russo, Ann; Torres, Lourdes (eds.). Third World Women and the Politics of Feminism. Indiana University Press. pp. 251–267. ISBN 0-253-33873-5. LCCN 90-43510.
- Vahabzadeh, Peyman (7 December 2015). "Fadāʾiān-e ḵalq". Encyclopædia Iranica.
- Zabir, Sepehr (2011) [1982]. Iran Since the Revolution. Routledge. pp. 109–111, 208. ISBN 978-0-415-61069-8.
