= Masoud Ahmadzadeh =

Iranian Marxist political theorist

- Born: 14 October 1946; Mashhad, Iran
- Died: 2 March 1972 (aged 27); Tehran, Iran

Education
- Education: University of Tehran

Philosophical work
- Region: Theoretician (Marxism)
- Main interests: Small Engine Diffusion, Modernity, Marxism, Communism
- Notable ideas: praxis as a revolutionary methodology,

Masoud Ahmadzadeh Heravi (2 March 1945 – 4 December 1972) was an Iranian Marxist political theorist. Though often described as a Revolutionary Communist, his work mostly dealt with the grounds that Struggle is concerned with 'Strategy' and 'Tactics'. His work centered on the idea that the “defeat of capitalism and comprador capitalism” is possible by “armed struggle both as a strategy and a tactic". He left Mashhad in 1964 and he went to Tehran and studied Mathematics at the University of Tehran. His works deal with politics, the nature of comprador capitalism, guerrilla warfare, monarchy, and dictatorship.

He was executed at the Chitgar shooting range for his military activities against the regime.
