= Organization of Iranian People's Fedai Guerrillas – Majority Left Wing =

Organization of Iranian People's Fedai Guerrillas–Majority Left Wing
- Leader: Mostafa Madani
- Founded: October 1980
- Dissolved: January 1982
- Split from: OIPF (Majority)
- Merged into: OIPFG (Minority)
- Ideology: Marxism-Leninism
- Political position: Left-wing

Organization of Iranian People's Fedai Guerrillas–Majority Left Wing (PIPFG–MLW) was a small pro-minority circle within the majority faction of the Iranian communist party Fedai Guerrillas. It was formed in April 1980, but decided to remain in the majority faction and published its position in the internal bulletin Be Pish (transl. On The Move). Following expel of its leader from the central committee, it broke away from the majority faction in October 1980.

== See also ==
- Organization of Iranian People's Fedai Guerrillas (1963–1980)
  - Iranian People's Fedai Guerrillas (1979–present)
  - Organization of Iranian People's Fedaian (Majority) (1980–present)
    - Organization of Iranian People's Fedai Guerrillas – Majority Left Wing (1980–1982)
  - Organization of Iranian People's Fedai Guerrillas (Minority) (1980–1987)
    - Organization of Iranian People's Fedai Guerrillas – Followers of the Identity Platform (1983–present)
    - Organization of Iranian People's Fedai Guerrillas (1985–present)
    - Fedaian Organisation (Minority) (1987–present)
