= Organization of Iranian People's Fedai Guerrillas (Minority) =

Fedai Guerrillas (Minority)
- Founder: Moḥammad Dabirifard (Ḥaydar)
- Founded: June 1980
- Dissolved: 1987
- Split from: Organization of Iranian People's Fedai Guerrillas
- Ideology: Marxism–Leninism; Anti-revisionism
- Political position: Left-wing

Organization of Iranian People's Fedai Guerrillas (Minority) (Persian: سازمان چريک‌های فدايی خلق ايران (اقليت), romanized: Sāzmān-e čerikhā-ye Fadāʾi-e ḵalq-e Irān (aqallīyat)) was an Iranian Marxist–Leninist organisation. An offshoot of the Organization of Iranian People's Fedai Guerrillas, it split from the majority faction, adhering to its original militant policy of opposing the Tudeh Party and challenging the Islamic Republic.

In January 1982, it was joined by the Organization of Iranian People's Fedaian-Majority Left Wing led by Moṣṭafā Madani, an offshoot of Organization of Iranian People's Fedaian (Majority) that broke away from the latter in October 1980.

The group was engaged in guerrilla warfare in the forests of northern Iran and Kurdistan Province. Its policy was against the Soviet Union and considered the Soviet Union of post-Stalin era as a revisionist state.

== See also ==
- Organization of Iranian People's Fedai Guerrillas (1963–1980)
  - Iranian People's Fedai Guerrillas (1979–present)
  - Organization of Iranian People's Fedaian (Majority) (1980–present)
    - Organization of Iranian People's Fedai Guerrillas – Majority Left Wing (1980–1982)
  - Organization of Iranian People's Fedai Guerrillas (Minority) (1980–1987)
    - Organization of Iranian People's Fedai Guerrillas – Followers of the Identity Platform (1983–present)
    - Organization of Iranian People's Fedai Guerrillas (1985–present)
    - Fedaian Organisation (Minority) (1987–present)
