= Communist Party of Iran (Marxist–Leninist–Maoist) =

Political party in Iran

Communist Party of Iran (Marxist–Leninist–Maoist) حزب کمونیست ایران (مارکسیست-لنینیست-مائوئیست)
- Founded: 2001; 25 years ago
- Preceded by: UICS
- Ideology: Communism; Marxism–Leninism–Maoism; New synthesis Secularism
- Political position: Far-left
- International affiliation: RIM (defunct)

Website
- https://cpimlm.org

The Communist Party of Iran (Marxist–Leninist–Maoist) (Persian: حزب کمونیست ایران (مارکسیست-لنینیست-مائوئیست)) is an Iranian Marxist-Leninist party working for revolution to establish a new socialist republic in place of the Islamic Republic of Iran. The party takes as its political framework the new synthesis of communism, and is a descendant of the Maoist Sarbedaran.

The party is continuation of Sarbedaran Movement and the Union of Iranian Communists (Sarbedaran) and was officially founded in 2001. CPI (MLM) believes that Iran is a 'semifeudal-semicolonial' country and is trying to launch 'People's war' in Iran.

CPI (MLM) have published several books and publishes regular magazines such as Haghighat (حقیقت, Persian for 'Truth') and Jahani Baraye Fath (جهانی برای فتح, a Persian translation of the RIM publication "A world to win"). The party also participates in various demonstrations abroad.

== Revolutionary theory ==
CPI (MLM) subscribes to Leninism's theory of Vanguardism. The party sees itself as guiding the Proletariat class of Iran through a revolutionary struggle. This Proletariat is open to all irrespective of nationality, gender or language. The party itself is open to both men and women and tolerates no antiwomen conduct. CPI (MLM) is an internationalist party that believes in the global Proletariat. The primary goal of the party is to eliminate oppression based on class, nationality or gender. This would be achieved by the violent overthrow of the Islamic Republic of Iran and establishing a new democratic and socialist state. This overthrow would be carried out by armed struggle by the masses. The CPI (MLM) believes that the vanguard will prevent reactionary cliques from attaining power after the masses carry out revolution. The new state would follow the Marxist theory of a Dictatorship of the proletariat. This would be the intermediate government between the periods of capitalism and communism. This period of transition would be defined by the change of the economic Base which would allow the reordering of the social system. Within the new social order all class distinctions would be eliminated, relations of productions that promote class distinction would be also be terminated. Social relations that allow oppression under capitalism would be deconstructed. The CPI (MLM) hopes to begin the world revolution and demonstrate an alternative to the system of global capitalism.

== Critiques of the Islamic Republic of Iran and foreign governments ==
=== Islamic Republic of Iran ===
CPI (MLM) sees the Islamic Republic of Iran as a Reactionary regime. The regime is viewed the same as the former Iranian Shahs or Imperial powers that have intervened in Iran in the past. These powers all sought to oppress the Iranian people based on ideology, ethnicity or gender. The party objects to the Regime calling itself revolutionary and instead deems the regime to be Fascistic in nature. The Islamic Republic's efforts to preserve the social order through implementation of Sharia law are anti revolutionary and repressive according to the party. The current Islamist policies are opposed by the secular CPI (MLM) as they preserve an ideological superstructure that allows for ultra conservative leaders and groups such as the Ayatollah and the Guardian Council to retain power. The CPI (MLM) demands the complete destruction of the state to overturn the culture and institutions that currently define Iranian thought and politics. The party critiques Iran's Nationalistic repression of Kurdish and Arab populations in the Kurdistan, Khuzestan and Baluchistan regions. These non Persian populations are subjected to prejudice from the state and educational institutions, often on the basis of language. The CPI (MLM) criticizes Iran's involvement in various regional wars which they deem reactionary. The Islamic Republic of Iran's excessive spending on military budgets and nuclear development programs is also subject to criticism. Iran's spending is often shunted towards political indoctrination and promotion of religious values while many are forced to live in poor conditions.

=== Turkey ===
The CPI (MLM) believes Turkey's government is Fascist. Turkey's invasion of Rojava and YPG controlled territories that are majority Kurdish in Syria is seen as genocidal by the CPI (MLM). They believe the Turkish efforts to establish a "safe zone" on Turkey's border with Syria is an attempt to weaken Kurdish movements in Turkey as well as abroad.

=== The United States of America ===
Liberal democracies such as the United States are criticized at large for their police presences, prohibition on certain forms of political thought and the domination of a capitalist elite. These Capitalists have turned to fascist ideas in order to preserve their position. These ideas include racism, prejudice towards immigrants, xenophobia, cultures of misogyny and religious dogmatism. These are the mechanisms of response to the problems created by the capitalist society itself.

== Internationalism ==
=== Communist party of Iran's (Marxist, Leninist, Maoist) theory of internationalism ===
The CPI's theory of internationalism is an alternative to the dominant global system of capitalism. Capitalism's domination is asserted to have made a "great portion of people around the world have increasingly become proletarians who in fact work 'to survive for the next day, even without having an hour to think'". In addition, the relations of production are said to produce “social faults” such as patriarchy and imperial domination of some nations by those that are more powerful. Capitalism's drastic and irreversible effects on the environment and the numerous wars over the drive for profit are also critiqued by the CPI (MLM). These myriad factors prove that much of the world would stand to benefit from a revolution that would overturn the current capitalist world order. CPI (MLM) aspires to be the launching point of a world revolution where the masses at large can see an alternative to the current systems of oppression. In order to truly lead a revolutionary movement a movement must not align itself with Imperial powers such as the United States, China, Russia and The European Union. Interaction with local reactionary governments (Iran, Turkey, Saudi Arabia, Israel, Syria and Iraq, etc...) is to be avoided as well. Interactions with outside powers disrupts the party's true goals of revolution and establishment of a communist social system. Imperial and reactionary states would never assist a global revolution as their interest are diametrically opposed. The CPI (MLM) sees the global capitalist system as dictating the policies of countries such as the United States. They are much more likely to support nation states as opposed to non government actors. The nation state fits into the system of global capitalism much easier than movements such as the CPI (MLM) or the Autonomous Administration of North and East Syria. The current system as well allows for the domination of some states economically by imperialist powers. The essential weakness that all reactionary states and imperialists have is that they are exploiters.

=== Revolutionary Internationalist Movement ===
The CPI works with various other Leninist Maoist parties in a larger organization known as the Revolutionary Internationalist Movement (RIM).

== See also ==
- Bhutan Communist Party (Marxist-Leninist-Maoist)
- Unified Communist Party of Nepal (Maoist)
- Communist Party of Turkey/Marxist-Leninist (Maoist Party Centre)
