= Union of Iranian Communists (Sarbedaran) =

Union of Iranian Communists (Sarbedaran) اتحادیه کمونیست‌های ایران
- Founded: 1976
- Dissolved: 2001
- Merger of: OCRML; Pooya Group
- Succeeded by: CPIMLM
- Ideology: Communism; Marxism-Leninism; Maoism
- Political position: Far-left
- International affiliation: RIM (defunct)

The Union of Iranian Communists (UIC), unofficially translated as the League of Iranian Communists (Persian: اتحادیه کمونیست‌های ایران, romanized: Ettehâdiyye-ye Komunist-hâ-ye Irân, lit. 'Union of the Communists of Iran') and simply known by its former armed branch's name Sarbedaran (/ˌsɑːrbɪdəˈrɑːn/; Persian: سربداران, romanized: Sarbedârân, lit. 'the head-on-gallow mass'), was a Maoist organization in Iran. The UIC(S) was formed in 1976 after the alliance of a number of Maoist groups carrying out military actions within Iran. The group prepared an insurrection starting in 1981, but it was dismantled by 1982.

Although it has gone through several ideological changes, it has maintained a general Maoist viewpoint advocating that Iran is not a capitalist society but a "semicolonial-semifeudal" one. In 2001 the UIC(S) became the Communist Party of Iran (Marxist-Leninist-Maoist).

== History ==
=== Foundation ===
The Union of Iranian Communists was founded in 1976 after the unification of the "Organization of Communist Revolutionaries" and "Pooya Group" (a remnant of “Palestine Group”). The term "Sarbedaran" was used later in 1981 after the organization armed its members in the forests near Amol in northern Iran in preparation for its armed uprising against the Islamic regime.

This union was a minor group and mainly operated in student movements abroad. Theoretically, due to their Maoist stance, the UIC(S) backed the People's Republic of China in the Sino-Soviet Split and opposed currents such as those held by the Tudeh Party who backed the USSR.

The UIC(S) expanded its activities inside Iran after the Iranian Revolution in 1979 and some other groups such as "Group of struggle in the path of working class liberation" and "Red Battle" also joined.

The UIC(S) did participate in some workers struggles at this time, such as "project syndicate of Abadan" and "Union of worker councils of Gilan" and also joined the war against the Islamic Republic in Kurdistan (and formed a guerrilla organization in Kurdistan named "Tashkilate Pishmargeye Zahmatkeshane Kordestan"). UIC(S) did also participate in peasant struggles in Turkaman, Sahra and Arab protests in Khuzistan. It also formed front organization such as "Militant Women Society" and "SETAD (Revolutionary Mass Organization of university and school Students)".

=== Armed uprising ===
Group of Sarbedaran guerrillas in forest, during the Amol Uprising 1982

1982 was an important year in the history of the UIC(S) and the history of Maoism in Iran in general. In this year the UIC(S) mobilized forces in forests around Amol and launched an armed campaign against the Islamic Republic. It eventually organized an uprising on 25 January 1982. The uprising was eventually a failure and many UIC(S) and Maoist leaders were killed.

=== Aftermath ===
After the failure of the “Amol Uprising” the group went through a difficult period with most of its leadership and cadres arrested or killed. It also experienced various theoretical and political crises.

In 1985 they again tried to organize militant struggle against the Islamic Republic but, again, this ended in failure. After this year they mainly operated in Kurdistan and against currents such as the Communist Party of Iran which they called "reformist" and "liquidationist".

In the late '80s they dropped some of their old slogans and strategies such as "Peoples’ war in rural areas and uprising in cities", "Revolution Path" etc. Instead they launched a new strategy and their slogan became "Protracted People's War: siege the cities via Villages". They also formulated their current "Marxist-Leninist-Maoist" stance.

=== Rebranding ===
In April 2001 they held the 'Founding Congress of Communist Party of Iran (Marxist-Leninist-Maoist)' and after some debates they established the Communist Party of Iran (Marxist-Leninist-Maoist) on May Day, 2001. The Communist Party of Iran (Marxist-Leninist-Maoist) is seen as a continuer of the Union of Iranian Communists (Sarbedaran).

== See also ==
- Communist Party of Iran (Marxist–Leninist–Maoist)
- Communist Party of Iran
