= Fedaian Organisation (Minority) =

- Founded: March 1987
- Preceded by: Organization of Iranian People's Fedai Guerrillas (Minority)
- Ideology: Communism; Marxism-Leninism

Website
- https://fadaian-aghaliyat.org/

Fadaian Organization or Organization of Fadayian (Minority) (Persian: سازمان فدائیان (اقليت), romanized: Sāzmān-e Fadāʾiān (aqallīyat)) is an Iranian Marxist-Leninist communist organization. The immediate goal of the organization was to overthrow the Islamic Republic of Iran and establish a Council democracy of workers and toilers. The publication of this organization is called "Kaar"(Persian: کار, lit. 'Labour') , and it is issued once a week in Farsi. This organization was formed in opposition to the majority of the Organization of Iranian People's Fedai Guerrillas in 1971 after their compromise with the Islamic Republic. Unlike the majority, the minority did not view the government as an anti-imperialist character, and they sought to replace it with a government of councils composed of workers and laborers.

The party condemned any alignment with the United States and Israel in combating Iranian government, calling the 2026 Iran war as "war of monsters".

== History ==
The Organization of Iranian People's Fedai Guerrillas began its struggle against the Pahlavi dynasty in 1971 with the Siahkal Uprising. This organization became one of the most popular leftist political movements during and after the 1979 Iranian Revolution, attracting significant mass support. After the revolution, disagreements over the class base of the Islamic Republic led to a split within the organization, dividing it into two organizations: Majority (Aksariat) and Minority (Aghaliat).

The sixth conference of the organization, held in January 1997, changed the name of the organization from "Organization of People's Fadaian Guerrillas (Minority)" to "Organization of Fadaian (Minority)", removing the words "guerrilla" and "people", which they recognized as belonging to a past era of the socialist struggle. The organization's seventh conference, held in August 1999, removed the "People's Democratic Republic" from the organization's program and replaced it with a "Council Government of Workers and Toilers."

== See also ==
- Organization of Iranian People's Fedai Guerrillas (1963–1980)
  - Iranian People's Fedai Guerrillas (1979–present)
  - Organization of Iranian People's Fedaian (Majority) (1980–present)
    - Organization of Iranian People's Fedai Guerrillas – Majority Left Wing (1980–1982)
  - Organization of Iranian People's Fedai Guerrillas (Minority) (1980–1987)
    - Organization of Iranian People's Fedai Guerrillas – Followers of the Identity Platform (1983–present)
    - Organization of Iranian People's Fedai Guerrillas (1985–present)
    - Fedaian Organisation (Minority) (1987–present)
