= Iranian People's Fedai Guerrillas =

- Leader: Ashraf Dehghani
- Founded: c. April 1979; 47 years ago
- Split from: OIPFG
- Headquarters: London, United Kingdom; Kurdistan, Iran (formerly)
- Ideology: Communism; Marxism-Leninism

Website
- https://siahkal.com/

The Iranian People's Fedai Guerrillas (IFPG; Persian: چريک‌های فدایی خلق ایران, romanized: čerikhā-ye Fadāʾi-e xalq-e Irān), also known as the Dehghani group (Persian: جریان دهقانی) after its leader Ashraf Dehghani, is an Iranian Marxist-Leninist communist organization that split from the Organization of Iranian People's Fedai Guerrillas (OIFPG) in 1979, dropping the word "organization" from its name.

Dehghani broke away from the OIFPG when she accused it of deviating from the strategy of guerrilla warfare. From the early days of Iranian Revolution, the group claimed to be the "sole genuine communist organization" and opposed the Islamic Republic. Reportedly, as many as 30% of OIFPG members joined the group and fought in the 1979 Kurdish rebellion against government forces, backing the Democratic Party of Iranian Kurdistan. Surviving members of the group and its factions moved to Europe in the 1990s. Currently, IFPG publishes two publications "Payam Fadaei" and "19 Bahman" in the Persian language.

== See also ==
- Guerrilla groups of Iran
- Organization of Iranian People's Fedai Guerrillas (1963–1980)
  - Iranian People's Fedai Guerrillas (1979–present)
  - Organization of Iranian People's Fedaian (Majority) (1980–present)
    - Organization of Iranian People's Fedai Guerrillas – Majority Left Wing (1980–1982)
  - Organization of Iranian People's Fedai Guerrillas (Minority) (1980–1987)
    - Organization of Iranian People's Fedai Guerrillas – Followers of the Identity Platform (1983–present)
    - Organization of Iranian People's Fedai Guerrillas (1985–present)
    - Fedaian Organisation (Minority) (1987–present)
