= Organization of Iranian People's Fedaian (Majority) =

Iranian political party based in Germany

Organization of People's Fadaian of Iran (Majority)
- Abbreviation: OPFIM
- Chair of the Political and Executive Committee: Tahmaseb Vaziri
- Founded: June 1980; 46 years ago
- Split from: OIPFG
- Headquarters: Berlin, Germany
- Ideology: Democratic socialism Secularism; Historical: Communism; Anti-imperialism
- Political position: Left-wing
- National affiliation: Union of People's Fedaian of Iran

Website
- https://kar-online.com/

The Organization of People's Fadaian of Iran (Majority) (OPFIM) (Persian: سازمان فدائیان خلق ایران (اکثریت), romanized: Sāzmān-e fedaiyān-e khalq-e Irān (aksariat), lit. 'Organization of self-sacrificers of the people of Iran') is an Iranian left-wing political organization advocating democratic socialism, secularism, social justice, gender equality, and human rights. The organization traces its origins to the Iranian People's Fedai Guerrillas, a Marxist guerrilla movement formed in 1971 following the Siahkal uprising against the government of Mohammad Reza Shah Pahlavi.

== History ==
The roots of the organization emerged in the 1960s among Iranian Marxist groups influenced by anti-colonial and revolutionary movements in Cuba, Vietnam, and Palestine. Two underground groups—the Jazani-Zarifi group and the Ahmadzadeh-Pouyan-Miftahi group—merged in April 1971 to form the Iranian People's Fedai Guerrillas Organization. The organization viewed armed struggle as the only viable means of opposition under the Shah's political repression following the 1953 coup d'état against Prime Minister Mohammad Mossadegh. (OPFIM Who We Are)

The group became one of the most prominent guerrilla organizations opposing the Pahlavi monarchy. During the 1970s, many members were killed or imprisoned by SAVAK, the Shah's security apparatus. Prominent members including Bijan Jazani and Hamid Ashraf were killed during this period. (OPFIM Who We Are)

The organization participated actively in the 1979 Iranian Revolution and gained significant support among students and sections of the Iranian left after the fall of the monarchy. Following the revolution, internal disagreements emerged regarding armed struggle and relations with the newly established Islamic Republic. (OPFIM Who We Are)

In 1980–1981, the majority faction adopted a policy favoring political participation and cooperation with aspects of the post-revolutionary government while criticizing political repression. Following internal splits, the organization adopted the name Organization of Iranian People's Fadaian (Majority). (OPFIM Who We Are)

During the 1980s, members of the organization faced arrests, imprisonment, and executions as part of the Islamic Republic's repression of opposition groups. After many leaders and activists went into exile, the organization gradually shifted away from revolutionary Marxism toward democratic socialism and pluralist politics. (OPFIM Who We Are)

Since the 1990s, the organization has participated in efforts to build alliances among Iranian republican and left-wing opposition groups. It has also taken part in discussions on secular democracy, human rights, and political reform in Iran. (OPFIM Who We Are)

== Political positions ==
The organization advocates democratic socialism, secular government, political pluralism, gender equality, labor rights, environmental protection, and opposition to discrimination based on class, ethnicity, religion, or gender. It supports a democratic transition in Iran and opposes the establishment of an ideological state. (OPFIM Program

== Publications ==
The organization's official publication, Kar (Work/Labor), was first published in 1979 and continues to operate online.(Kar-Online.com)

== See also ==
- Organization of Iranian People's Fedai Guerrillas (1963–1980)
  - Iranian People's Fedai Guerrillas (1979–present)
  - Organization of Iranian People's Fedaian (Majority) (1980–present)
    - Organization of Iranian People's Fedai Guerrillas – Majority Left Wing (1980–1982)
  - Organization of Iranian People's Fedai Guerrillas (Minority) (1980–1987)
    - Organization of Iranian People's Fedai Guerrillas – Followers of the Identity Platform (1983–present)
    - Organization of Iranian People's Fedai Guerrillas (1985–present)
    - Fedaian Organisation (Minority) (1987–present)
- List of political parties in Iran
- History of Iran
