= Organization of Iranian People's Fedai Guerrillas =

1971–1980 Iranian Marxist–Leninist guerrilla organisation

Organization of Iranian People's Fedai Guerrillas سازمان چريک‌های فدايی خلق ايران
- Abbreviation: OIPFG
- Spokesperson: Mehdi Fatapour
- Secretary of the Central Committee: Farrokh Negahdar
- Founded: late 1963 initial activity April 1971 as the unified organization
- Dissolved: June 1980
- Merger of: Jazani-Ẓarifi Group and Aḥmadzāda-Puyān-Meftāḥi Group
- Succeeded by: OIPF (M); OIPFG (M); IPFG
- Headquarters: Tehran
- Newspaper: Kar
- Ideology: Communism; Marxism–Leninism; Anti-revisionism; Anti-imperialism
- Political position: Far-left
- Colors: Red
- Anthem: Aftabkaran-e-Jangal (lit. 'Sunplanters of Jungle')

Party flag

Organization of Iranian People's Fedai Guerrillas
- Leaders: Hamid Ashraf (KIA); Ashraf Dehghani (POW)
- Dates active: 1971–1976; 1977–1980
- Groups: Urban team, rural team
- Size: 3,000 (estimate)
- Wars: Black September, Iranian Revolution, Iran hostage crisis, Consolidation of the Iranian Revolution

The Organization of Iranian People's Fedai Guerrillas (OIPFG; Persian: سازمان چريک‌های فدايی خلق ايران, romanized: Sâzmân-e Čerik-hâye Fadâyi-e Xalğ-e Irân), simply known as Fadaiyan-e-Khalq (Persian: فداییان خلق, romanized: Fadâ'iān-e Xalğ, lit. 'Devotees of the People') was an underground Marxist–Leninist guerrilla organization in Iran.

The OIPFG was one of the most important and influential armed groups during the Iranian Revolution, although this organization failed to achieve its goal and lost many of its members, it had a great impact on some radical Iranian intellectuals of its generation. After its formation, the loyalists were able to carry out several important and noisy operations and assassinations, such as the Siahkal incident, the explosion of electricity pylons, the explosion of some police stations, the assassination of Major General Farsiu, the assassination of Mohammad Sadeq Fateh Yazdi, one of the largest factories in Iran, attacking and robbing government banks, and bombing the offices of American oil companies.

== Origin ==
The Fedaian began as a radical leftist guerilla group, established in 1971 as the Organization of the Iranian People's Fedai Guerillas. By the 1960s the Shah's ability to repress dissent was decreasing. The establishment of the OIPFG can be contextualized in the growing global unrest towards imperialism and colonial rule.

The regime had used harsh violence to repress opposition in 1963, paving the way for more radical groups to form. The army's growing tendency to gun down protestors forced opposition into guerilla groups. The OIPFG was formed and influenced by three different activist groups. The first was founded by Bijan Jazani, an activist and Marxist intellectual, in 1963. A student of political science, he had been in and out of prisons since the 1950s. The second was an offshoot of the growing student movement in 1967, led by Ahmadzade and A.P. Pouyan. The third group was formed in 1965 in Tabriz by a group of intellectuals. Included in the founders is the poet Ali Reza Nabdel, who would go on to write pamphlets for the organization. All three groups merged in 1971, when both came to the conclusion that armed struggle was the only way to defeat the Shah's regime and American influence.

The groups started to overlap in 1970, with the first armed attack being a robbery of a bank in Tehran in order to bankroll the new organization. By the end of the year, the group was unified and had a three-cell structure. An "urban team," a "publication team," and a "rural team."

== Ideology ==
Ideologically, the group pursued an anti-imperialist agenda and embraced armed propaganda to justify its revolutionary armed struggle against Iran's monarchy, and believed in Materialism. They rejected reformism, and were inspired by the thoughts of Mao Zedong, Che Guevara, and Régis Debray.

They criticized the National Front and the Liberation Movement as "Petite bourgeoisie paper organizations still preaching the false hope of peaceful change". Fedai Guerrillas initially criticized the Soviet Union and the Tudeh Party as well, however they later abandoned the stance as a result of cooperation with the socialist camp.

Bijan Jazani, known as the "intellectual father" of the organization, contributed to its ideology by writing a series of pamphlets such as "Struggle against the Shah's Dictatorship", "What a Revolutionary Must Know" and "How the Armed Struggle Will Be Transformed into a Mass Struggle?". The pamphlets were followed by Masoud Ahmadzadeh's treatise "Armed Struggle: Both a Strategy and a Tactic" and "The Necessity of Armed Struggle and the Rejection of the Theory of Survival" by Amir Parviz Pouyan.

== Electoral history ==
Year	Election	Seats won
1979	Constitutional Assembly	0 / 73 (0%)
1980	Parliament	0 / 290 (0%)

== Leadership ==
The group was governed by collective leadership. Before the Iranian Revolution, its six-members leadership did not use the term 'central committee'.

Leadership (Until 1979)
#	Name	Alias
1	Ahmad Gholamian-Langerudi	Hadi
2	Qorbanali Rahimpur	Majid
3	Qasem Siyadati	—N/a
4	Farrokh Negahdar	—N/a
5	Reza Ghebra'i	Mansour
6	Unknown	Unknown

Executive Committee (1979–1980)
#	Name
1	Farrokh Negahdar
2	Mostafa Madani
3	Kazem Mobini

Central Committee (1979–1980)
#	Name	Alias
1	Ahmad Gholamian-Langerudi	Hadi
2	Qorbanali Rahimpur	Majid
3	Mehdi Fattapur	—N/a
4	Farrokh Negahdar	—N/a
5	Reza Ghebra'i	Mansour
6	Mostafa Madani	—N/a
7	Kazem Mobini	—N/a
8	Asghar Soltanabadi	Kiumars
9	Ali Tavasoli	—N/a
10	Unknown	Haydar
11	Unknown	Akbar

== See also ==
- Guerrilla groups of Iran
- Organization of Iranian People's Fedai Guerrillas (1963–1980)
  - Iranian People's Fedai Guerrillas (1979–present)
  - Organization of Iranian People's Fedaian (Majority) (1980–present)
    - Organization of Iranian People's Fedai Guerrillas – Majority Left Wing (1980–1982)
  - Organization of Iranian People's Fedai Guerrillas (Minority) (1980–1987)
    - Organization of Iranian People's Fedai Guerrillas – Followers of the Identity Platform (1983–present)
    - Organization of Iranian People's Fedai Guerrillas (1985–present)
    - Fedaian Organisation (Minority) (1987–present)
