= Socialism in Iran =

Political ideology in Iran

Socialism in Iran, also called Iranian socialism, is a political ideology that has shaped Iranian politics since the early 20th century. The socialist tradition in Iran emerged during the Constitutional Revolution of 1905–1911, when Iranian intellectuals and workers came into contact with European and Russian radical thought, and it developed through a succession of parties, movements, and revolutionary organisations over the following decades.

The earliest socialist organisations in Iran were founded by Iranian emigrants in Transcaucasia who maintained close ties with the Russian Social Democratic Labour Party. During the constitutional era, several competing socialist and social-democratic parties competed in the nascent Iranian parliament. After the First World War and the October Revolution, a more explicitly communist current emerged, culminating in the short-lived Gilan Soviet Republic (1920–1921) and the formation of the Communist Party of Persia. Under Reza Shah's authoritarian rule in the 1920s–1940s, independent political parties were suppressed, and organised socialist activity was largely driven underground or abroad.

Following Reza Shah's forced abdication in 1941, a new era of political pluralism briefly flourished. The Tudeh Party of Iran, founded in 1941, became the largest communist organisation in the country and at its height commanded significant popular support. At the same time, a broader nationalist-socialist current coalesced around Mohammad Mosaddegh and the National Front, which led the successful campaign to nationalise the Iranian oil industry and briefly governed Iran between 1951 and 1953. The 1953 Iranian coup d'état, engineered with British and American support, toppled Mosaddegh and inaugurated a period of renewed repression that scattered the Iranian left.

In the 1960s and 1970s, a new generation of socialist activists rejected both the Tudeh Party's alignment with the Soviet Union and the National Front's parliamentary approach, turning instead to Marxist–Leninist guerrilla strategy. The principal organisation of this tendency was the Organization of Iranian People's Fedai Guerrillas, founded in 1963. Although many on the left initially supported the Iranian Revolution of 1979, the new Islamic Republic quickly moved against socialist and communist groups, executing hundreds of activists in the early 1980s and forcing the surviving organisations into exile. Since then, Iranian socialist parties have continued to operate primarily from abroad, advocating for a secular democratic republic.

== History ==
=== Constitutional era and early socialist movements (1905–1921) ===
Socialist ideas first entered Iran through the networks of Iranian workers and intellectuals in Tsarist Transcaucasia, particularly in Baku, who were in close contact with Russian and Azerbaijani social democrats. The Social Democratic Party, established around 1904–1905, was Iran's first socialist organisation and maintained close links with the Russian Social Democratic Labour Party. It combined European socialist principles with nationalist and liberal ideas, and played a significant role in the Constitutional Revolution of 1905–1911 by mobilising popular support for a constitutional monarchy and the curtailment of royal and clerical power.

During the constitutional era, Iran's new parliament (the Majlis) saw the formation of several competing parties with varying degrees of socialist orientation. The Democrat Party, founded in 1909, was the more radical of the two main parliamentary groupings, advocating the separation of religion and state and drawing its membership largely from middle-class intellectuals with connections to the Baku-based Social Democratic Party. Its rival, the Moderate Socialists Party, represented a more conservative and clerical-influenced current. Other organisations from this period included the Unified Socialist Party, the Union and Progress Party, and the Socialist Revolutionary Party, the last of which was based in Baku and was among the most significant organisations founded by Iranian emigrants in Transcaucasia.

The Bolshevik Revolution of 1917 profoundly influenced the Iranian left. The Justice Party, founded in 1917 by former members of the Social Democratic Party, aligned itself with the Bolsheviks and participated in the Communist International, renaming itself the Communist Party of Iran in 1920. That same year, a short-lived Soviet Republic was proclaimed in Gilan under the Jangali movement leader Mirza Kuchik Khan, with communist support. The experiment ended in defeat in 1921, and the Young Communist League of Persia, which had been active in the Gilan uprising, was subsequently suppressed.

=== The Reza Shah era and the suppression of the left (1921–1941) ===
Following Reza Khan's rise to power—first as prime minister and then as shah in 1925—Iran's nascent socialist and labour movements were systematically dismantled. The Socialist Party, which had been one of four political groups courted by Reza Khan as he consolidated power, refused to endorse his claim to the throne on republican grounds. In the years following his coronation, the party was dissolved, its leaders forced into retirement, and its offices and affiliated institutions attacked by mobs organised with government support. Most other independent political parties, socialist or otherwise, met a similar fate. In 1937, a group of 53 intellectuals and activists—including several who would later help found the Tudeh Party—were imprisoned on charges of communist conspiracy, illustrating the Shah's thoroughgoing repression of the left.

=== The Mosaddegh era and the crisis of 1953 (1941–1953) ===
The abdication of Reza Shah in 1941, under Allied pressure during the Second World War, opened a new period of political competition. The Tudeh Party of Iran was founded the same year by former members of the "Group of 53" and quickly became Iran's most significant left-wing force, attracting trade unionists, intellectuals, and professionals. At its height, the Tudeh Party commanded the largest trade union federation in Iranian history and had significant influence in the press, universities, and the military officer corps—though it never achieved governmental power.

Alongside the Tudeh Party, a broader coalition of nationalist, liberal, and socialist forces coalesced in the National Front, formed in 1949 around Mohammad Mosaddegh. The National Front's central demand was the nationalisation of the Anglo-Iranian Oil Company, which it achieved after Mosaddegh became prime minister in 1951. The backbone of the National Front was the Iran Party, founded in 1941 by European-educated technocrats who modelled their socialism on the moderate French Socialist Party and the Fabian Society rather than on Marxist doctrine. Other founding members of the National Front included the Movement of God-Worshipping Socialists, which sought to synthesise Shi'a Islam and socialist ideals, and various nationalist groupings.

The 1953 Iranian coup d'état, carried out with CIA and MI6 involvement, overthrew Mosaddegh in August 1953 and restored full power to Mohammad Reza Shah. The Tudeh Party was outlawed, thousands of its members arrested, and many executed or tortured. The Iran Party and other National Front organisations were suppressed. The coup effectively ended the first phase of mass socialist politics in Iran and inaugurated nearly two decades of authoritarian rule in which organised left activity was impossible inside the country.

=== Guerrilla socialism and the Islamic Revolution (1963–1979) ===
The failure of parliamentary and mass-movement strategies led a new generation of Iranian leftists in the 1960s and 1970s to embrace guerrilla warfare as the path to revolution. Inspired by the writings of Mao Zedong, Che Guevara, and Régis Debray, and by homegrown theorists such as Bijan Jazani, the Organization of Iranian People's Fedai Guerrillas (OIPFG), founded in 1963, became the principal expression of this tendency. The OIPFG carried out armed operations against the Shah's regime and was severely repressed by SAVAK, the secret police. Parallel organisations included the Marxist splinter Peykar (founded 1975), which broke from the People's Mujahedin of Iran to adopt secular Marxism-Leninism.

The Islamic Revolution of 1979 was a contradictory moment for the Iranian left. Most socialist and communist organisations initially supported the revolution, seeing it as an anti-imperialist uprising against the Shah and his American backers. The Tudeh Party and the OIPFG's majority faction aligned themselves with Ruhollah Khomeini in the revolution's early years. However, the Islamic Republic moved to consolidate a theocratic order and, particularly after the rupture with the left in 1981–1983, launched a wave of executions and imprisonments that effectively destroyed the organised socialist movement inside Iran. The 1988 executions of Iranian political prisoners killed thousands of left-wing detainees.

=== After the revolution (1979–present) ===
Following the mass repression of the early 1980s, the Iranian socialist movement has existed primarily in exile. The Organization of Iranian People's Fedaian (Majority) was considered the largest communist organisation in Iran from 1980 to 1991 but has since operated in exile, advocating for a secular Iranian republic. The Communist Party of Iran, formed in 1983 from a merger of Marxist–Leninist and Kurdish leftist organisations, remains active particularly among Iranian Kurds. Various splinter groups and factions have continued to operate abroad, often divided over questions of strategy and ideology, including assessments of the 1979 revolution.

== Political parties and organisations ==
=== Social Democratic Party ===
The Social Democratic Party was established in 1904 or 1905 by Iranian emigrants in Transcaucasia, with assistance from local revolutionaries. The party maintained close ties with the Russian Social Democratic Labour Party and the Hemmat Party. It was the first socialist organization in Iran. The party developed a unique blend of European socialism and indigenous ideas, while also advocating liberalism and nationalism. Although critical of the conservative ulama, it retained some religious beliefs and supported the separation of church and state. The party was founded by Haydar Khan Amo-oghli and led by Nariman Narimanov.

=== Unified Socialist Party and Social Reformers Party ===
During the constitutional era, the Unified Socialist Party and the Social Reformers Party were socialist political parties in Qajar Iran. The Social Reformers Party was considered more moderate compared to the economic platforms of the Democrat Party and the Social Democratic Party, although it similarly opposed the landlords.

=== Union and Progress Party ===
The Union and Progress Party was a political party during the constitutional era of Qajar Iran. In the 1909 Persian legislative election, the party won four seats and allied with the Moderate Socialists Party against the Democrat Party.

=== Democrat Party ===
The Democrat Party, founded in 1909 during the constitutional era of Qajar Iran, was one of two major parliamentary parties at the time, alongside its rival, the Moderate Socialists Party. The party followed a social democrat ideology and was initially an offshoot of the Transcaucasia-based Social Democratic Party. However, it severed direct ties with Baku and removed "Socialist" from its name to appeal to the conservative public, although its ideology remained heavily influenced by the original party. The party was largely composed of middle-class intellectuals and advocated for the separation of church and state.

In 1918, the party split into two factions: the Pro-Reorganization Democrats, led by Bahar, and the Anti-Reorganization Democrats. Notable members included Hassan Taqizadeh and Haydar Khan Amo-oghli.

=== Socialist Revolutionary Party ===
Founded in the 1900s, the Socialist Revolutionary Party, also known as the Social-Revolutionaries, was an Iranian revolutionary socialist party based in Baku, Caucasus Viceroyalty. It was one of the most significant parties established by Iranian emigrants in Transcaucasia during the Qajar era. The party published an Azerbaijani-language newspaper, Ekinçi ve Fe'le, which was issued twice a week and edited by Hosayn Israfilbekov.

=== Communist Party of Persia ===
The Communist Party of Persia, originally established in 1917 as the Justice Party, was an Iranian communist party founded by former members of the Social Democratic Party who supported the Baku-based Bolsheviks. The party participated in the Third International in 1919 and was renamed the Communist Party of Iran in 1920.

=== Socialist Party ===
During the 1920s, the Socialist Party was a leading left-wing political party in Iran. It maintained close ties with the Tudeh Party of Iran and joined the Tudeh-led United Front of Progressive Parties in 1946, eventually being absorbed by the larger group. The roots of the Socialist Party lay in the Democrat Party, a reformist group active in the early 20th century. After the disintegration of that movement, members who retained faith in mobilizing the lower and middle classes regrouped under the Socialist Party banner in 1921. The party was led by Sulayman Eskandari, Muhammad Musavat, and Qasim Khan Sur, along with Muhammad Sadiq Tabatabai, a member of a prominent clerical family recruited to mitigate opposition from conservative clerics. The party’s main newspaper, Toufan (Storm), was edited by the outspoken and controversial poet Mohammad Farrokhi Yazdi.

The party established branches in Rasht, Qazvin, Bandar Anzali, Tabriz, Mashhad, Kerman, and Kermanshah, although Tehran remained its primary base of operations. In the capital, the party founded four newspapers and established affiliated organizations, including the Union of Employees in the Ministry of Post and Telegraph, a Tenants Association, and the Patriotic Women's Society. The latter campaigned for a broader role for women in Iranian society, promoting initiatives such as education for girls and improved healthcare for women. It was founded in 1922 by Mohtaram Eskandari and quickly became affiliated with her husband’s party.

The party’s platform advocated for establishing equality in society, nationalizing the means of production, implementing irrigation schemes, introducing a new level of regional government, ensuring a free and equal judiciary, guaranteeing rights to free speech, free assembly, and trade union rights, conducting free elections, expanding access to education, improving working conditions, ending child labour, and promoting government intervention against unemployment. The party gained some support, attracting 2,500 members in Tehran alone shortly after its formation.

Alongside the Reformist Party, the Revival Party and the Communist Party, the Socialist Party was one of the four groups courted by Reza Shah as he sought to secure the Iranian throne. It joined forces with the Revival Party to form a working majority in the Iranian parliament, enabling Reza Khan (as he was then known) to establish a reformist government. However, Reza Khan soon distanced himself from the Socialists, aligning with more conservative elements after abandoning plans for a republic and opting to establish himself as king. The Socialist Party was one of the few groups in parliament that refused to actively support Reza’s rise to the throne, arguing that their republican principles prevented them from endorsing a monarchy, despite supporting many of his reforms.

Following Reza Shah’s ascension, the Socialist Party was dissolved as part of a broader crackdown on anti-monarchist dissent. Eskandari was forced to retire from public life, and mobs were organized to harass party members and attack their properties. A police-led mob razed a Socialist Theatre in Enzeli on the pretext that a female actor had appeared on stage during a performance of Tartuffe. In Tehran, the Patriotic Women's Society was stoned, and its library was burned down. A minor group of the same name re-emerged in 1944 when radical members of the Comrades Party split from that group over its failure to support striking workers in Isfahan.

=== Young Communist League of Persia ===
The Young Communist League of Persia, founded during the Gilan Revolution, was a communist youth organization established in Qajar Iran following the split between the communist and non-communist Jangali elements on 31 July 1920. The YCL of Persia engaged in agitation and propaganda activities and organized armed actions against the followers of Kuchik Khan. The organization was dismantled after the defeat of the Gilan Soviet.

In 1927, various communist youth groups merged to reestablish the YCL of Persia. It became a section of the Young Communist International. However, in the autumn of 1928, the organization was suppressed along with other leftist groups.

=== Revolutionary Republican Party of Iran ===
Founded in late 1924 by the Iranian diaspora in Germany, the Revolutionary Republican Party of Iran was a moderate left-wing political party in Qajar Iran with socialist reformist tendencies. The party published its platform in 1926.

=== Jungle Party ===
Active in northern Iran during the 1940s, the Jungle Party was a secessionist, nationalist, and socialist party founded by armed rebels seeking to revive the Persian Socialist Soviet Republic established in 1921, using its red flag as a symbol. The party was supported by some of Mirza Kuchik Khan's former associates. In 1946, the Jungle Party allied with the Iran Party, the Tudeh Party of Iran, the Democratic Party of Iranian Kurdistan, and the Azerbaijani Democratic Party.

=== Iran Party ===
Established in 1941, the Iran Party is described as the "backbone of the National Front", the leading umbrella organization of Iranian nationalists. Founded mainly by European-educated technocrats, the party advocated for "a diluted form of French socialism" (i.e., it "modeled itself on" the moderate Socialist Party of France) and promoted social democracy, liberal nationalism, and secularism. The party’s socialist stance was more akin to that of the Fabian Society than to the scientific socialism of Karl Marx. Its focus on liberal socialist and democratic socialist principles made it distinct from purely left-wing parties, and it did not engage much in labour rights discussions. The core of the party consisted of members from the Iranian Engineers' Association.

In the Iranian legislative election of 1944, five of the party's leaders—Rezazadeh Shafaq, Ghulam'Ali Farivar, AhdulHamid Zanganeh, Hussein Mu'aven, and Abdallah Mu'azemi—won seats, along with Mohammad Mosaddegh, who was not a member but was effectively supported by the party. The party played a key role in helping Mosaddegh establish the National Front, nationalize the oil industry, and rise to power. Several members held office during the Mosaddegh government.

In the 1950s, the party was led by Karim Sanjabi and Allah-Yar Saleh. It was suppressed following the British-American backed coup d'état in 1953 and outlawed in 1957 on the grounds of its alliance with the Tudeh Party of Iran a decade earlier. The party was revived in 1960 and actively contributed to the National Front (II), which disintegrated in 1963 and was forced to operate secretly. The Iran Party held a congress in 1964.

Not much is known about the party's activities between 1964 and the mid-1970s, except for some irregular meetings and exchanges of views. In 1977, alongside the League of Socialists and the Nation Party, it helped revive the National Front (IV) and demanded the return of Ruhollah Khomeini to Iran. In early 1979, Shapour Bakhtiar, the secretary-general of the party, was appointed as the last Prime Minister by the Shah, with two Iran Party members in his cabinet. However, the party denounced Bakhtiar's acceptance of the post, expelled him, and labeled him a "traitor." After 1979, the Iran Party did not play a significant role in the Iranian political arena and was soon banned.

=== Comrades Party ===
During the 1940s, the Comrades Party was part of a wave of political groupings established following the removal of Rezā Shāh. The party was founded in November 1942 by Mustafa Fateh, a British-educated economist who was close to the Tudeh Party of Iran but opposed its close relationship with the Soviet Union. Fateh, who had been an important figure in the Anglo-Iranian Oil Company, edited the Tudeh paper Mardom for a time before establishing his own journal, Emruz va Farda. Abbas Narraqi, another founding member, had been one of 53 men imprisoned in 1937 on charges of conspiring to lead a communist revolution.

The Comrades Party called for two main goals: political equality for all Iranians and the nationalization of the means of production. It put forward ten candidates in the 1944 election, all of whom came from professional backgrounds. Two members of the Comrades Party were elected to the Majlis of Iran, where they sat with the Individuals' Caucus, a group they formed with the Iran Party and various independents, all of whom largely followed the lead of Mohammad Mosaddegh.

The party split in 1944 following a dispute in Isfahan, where clashes between striking workers and local tribes loyal to the Shah broke out amid accusations that the workers were attempting to lead a communist revolution. The Majlis-based wing of the Comrades Party condemned the workers and affirmed their loyalty to the Shah. However, another external group joined Tudeh in supporting the strikers. This group, which maintained control of Emruz va Farda, broke away to form the Socialist Party.

=== Movement of God-Worshipping Socialists ===
Founded in 1943, the Movement of God-Worshipping Socialists was one of six original member organizations of the National Front. The party was led by Muhammed Nakhshab. It was formed through the merger of two groups: Nakhshab's circle of high school students at Dar al-Fanoun and Jalaleddin Ashtiyani's circle of about 25 students at the Faculty of Engineering at Tehran University. Initially known as the League of Patriotic Muslims, the organization combined religious sentiments, nationalism, and socialist ideals.

Nakhshab is credited with the first synthesis between Shi'ism and European socialism. His movement was based on the belief that Islam and socialism were not incompatible, as both sought to achieve social equality and justice. His theories were outlined in his B.A. thesis on the laws of ethics.

=== Azerbaijani Democratic Party ===
The Azerbaijani Democratic Party was a pro-Soviet, separatist, and pan-Turkist political party founded by Jafar Pishevari in Tabriz, Iran, in September 1945.

=== United Front of Progressive Parties ===
From 1946 to 1948, the United Front of Progressive Parties was a political alliance of left-wing parties in Iran. It was originally founded by the communist Tudeh Party and the socialist Iran Party, which invited other parties to join them in their alleged struggle for "social progress and national independence". One of the main planks of the United Front was to recognize the Central Council of United Trade Unions as the sole legitimate organization of the working class in Iran.

=== Iran Unity Party ===
The Iran Unity Party was a socialist political party formed after splitting from the Iran Party following its alliance with the communist Tudeh Party of Iran in 1946. According to Leonard Binder, the party was in a coalition with the National Union Party and the Socialist Party in the 14th parliament.

=== Toilers Party of the Iranian Nation ===
Founded on 16 May 1951 by Mozzafar Baghai, the Toilers Party of the Iranian Nation was a social-democratic political party, initially a member of the National Front. The party pledged support for the nationalization of Iran's oil industry and opposed the Tudeh Party. It successfully attracted a considerable following among educated youth, especially at the University of Tehran, Third Force activists, and shopkeepers from Kerman's bazzar. The party also included a nucleus of čāqukeš and čumāqdār.

In the 1952 legislative election, the party won two seats, held by Baghai and Zohari. The party split in 1952 over its relationship with the government of Mosaddegh. Under the leadership of Mozzafar Baghai, the Toilers Party left the National Front and openly opposed the government. Meanwhile, Khalil Maleki re-established the Third Force under the name Toilers Party of the Iranian Nation — Third Force and continued to support the government.

The Toilers Party formed an alliance with the Society of Mujahed Muslims, led by Ayatollah Kashani, pooling their resources and coordinating activities against the government. The party actively participated in the 1953 coup d'état calling it a "national uprising," but opposed Fazlollah Zahedi's post-coup military government. Following their opposition, their newspapers were banned, and their party office was confiscated by the government. The party went into hiatus until the 1960 Iranian legislative election. It resumed activity in 1961 and expressed support for Ayatollah Khomeini during the 5 June 1963 demonstrations.

In 1971, the party was reorganized with government permission, but was forced to cease its activities in 1975 following the announcement of the one-party state under the Resurgence Party. In 1977, Baghai attempted to revive the party, declaring loyalty to the Pahlavi dynasty, although at a restricted level. The party was soon dissolved following the 1979 Iranian Revolution.

=== League of Iranian Socialists ===
In 1960, the League of Socialists of the National Movement of Iran, also known as the Society of Iranian Socialists, was founded by Third Force activists led by Khalil Maleki, along with a number of radical nationalists, most of whom had social democratic leanings, and some members with Islamic socialist tendencies. Hossein Malek, Ahmad Sayyed Javadi, and Jalal Al-e-Ahmad were among the key figures associated with the group. The party, which had a socialist and nationalist ideology, formally joined the Socialist International upon its establishment.

The organization was a founding member of the National Front (II) and was considered the "extreme left-wing" within the front. After the Iranian Revolution, it broke with the National Front and joined the National Democratic Front. In the Iranian presidential election of 1980, the group supported the People's Mujahedin of Iran nominee Massoud Rajavi.

=== Organization of Iranian People's Fedai Guerrillas ===
Founded in 1963, the Organization of Iranian People's Fedai Guerrillas (OIPFG) was a Marxist-Leninist underground guerrilla organization that pursued an anti-imperialist agenda and embraced armed propaganda to justify its revolutionary struggle against Iran's monarchy system. The organization adhered to materialism and rejected reformism, drawing inspiration from the thoughts of Mao Zedong, Che Guevara, and Régis Debray. Bijan Jazani, known as the "intellectual father" of the organization, contributed to its ideology by writing a series of influential pamphlets including Struggle Against the Shah's Dictatorship, What a Revolutionary Must Know, and How the Armed Struggle Will Be Transformed into a Mass Struggle?. These pamphlets were followed by Masoud Ahmadzadeh's Armed Struggle: Both a Strategy and a Tactic and Amir Parviz Pouyan's The Necessity of Armed Struggle and the Rejection of the Theory of Survival.

The Fedai Guerrillas criticized the National Front and the Liberation Movement, describing them as "petite bourgeoisie paper organizations still preaching the false hope of peaceful change". Initially, the organization also criticized the Soviet Union and the Tudeh Party, but later abandoned this stance due to cooperation with the socialist camp.

In June 1973, the organization merged with the People's Democratic Front. However, ideological differences existed between the two groups, as the People's Democratic Front opposed Leninism, seeing it as a deviation from Marxism.

=== Organization of Communist Revolutionaries (Marxist–Leninist) ===
Founded in 1969, the Organization of Communist Revolutionaries (Marxist–Leninist) was formed in opposition to the Shah regime in Iran and was active in the Iranian student movement in exile. The organization adhered to Marxism–Leninist and Maoist ideology and later merged with the Union of Iranian Communists (Sarbedaran).

=== Union of Iranian Communists (Sarbedaran) ===
The Union of Iranian Communists (Sarbedaran), also unofficially translated by others as the League of Iranian Communists, was a Maoist organization in Iran. The UIC(S) was formed in 1976 after the alliance of several Maoist groups carrying out military actions within Iran. The group began preparing for an insurrection in 1981, but it was dismantled by 1982.

=== Peykar ===
Founded in 1975, the Organization of Struggle for the Emancipation of the Working Class, or Peykar, also known as the Marxist Mojahedin, was a Marxist splinter group from the People's Mujahedin of Iran (PMoI). Its members broke away from the PMoI to support secular Marxism-Leninism, rather than the Leftist Islamist modernism of the People's Mujahedin. The group's leaders included Alireza Sepasi-Ashtiani and Hossein Rouhani. By the early 1980s, Peykar was no longer considered active and was subsequently suppressed through imprisonment and executions.

=== Movement of Militant Muslims ===
Founded in 1977, the Movement of Militant Muslims is an Iranian Islamic socialist political group led by Habibollah Payman. The group was revolutionary and is closely associated with the Council of Nationalist-Religious Activists of Iran. The party's ideology combines Islamic socialism, social democracy, and anti-imperialism.

=== Union of Communist Militants ===
Founded in December 1978, the Union of Communist Militants (EMK) was an Iranian Maoist group established by Mansoor Hekmat. The group participated in the Iranian Revolution of 1979, which was marked by the creation of workers' councils (shoras). Due to increasing repression in Iran, the organization sought refuge in Kurdistan in 1981. In Kurdistan, the organization merged with a Kurdish Maoist group, Komalah. Together, they formed the Communist Party of Iran (CPI) in September 1983.

=== Organization of Iranian People's Fedaian (Majority) ===
The Organization of Iranian People's Fadaian (Majority) is an Iranian left-wing opposition political party in exile. The OIPFM advocates for a secular Iranian republic and the overthrow of the current Islamic Republic of Iran government. An offshoot of the Organization of Iranian People's Fedai Guerrillas, it was considered the largest communist organization in Iran from 1980 to 1991.

=== Iranian People's Fedai Guerrillas ===
Founded in c. April 1979, the Iranian People's Fedai Guerrillas (IFPG), also known as the Dehghani faction after its leader Ashraf Dehghani, is an Iranian communist organization that split from the Organization of Iranian People's Fedai Guerrillas (OIPFG) in 1979, dropping the word "organization" from its name. Dehghani broke away from the OIPFG after accusing it of deviating from the strategy of guerrilla warfare. From the early days of the Iranian Revolution, the group claimed to be the "sole genuine communist organization" and opposed the Islamic Republic. Reportedly, as much as 30% of OIPFG members joined the group and fought in the 1979 Kurdish rebellion against government forces, supporting the Democratic Party of Iranian Kurdistan. Surviving members of the group and its factions moved to Europe in the 1990s.

=== Organization of Working-class Freedom Fighters ===
Founded in 1979, the Organization of Working-class Freedom Fighters, or simply Razmandegan, was a communist party in Iran that opposed both the Soviet line and the guerrilla doctrine.

=== Fedaian Organisation (Minority) ===
Founded in 1980, the Fedaian Organisation (Minority) was an Iranian Marxist-Leninist organization and an offshoot of the Organization of Iranian People's Fedai Guerrillas. It split from the majority faction over a dispute, adhering to the original militant policy of the group, opposing the Tudeh Party, and insisting on challenging the Islamic Republic. In January 1982, it was joined by the "Organization of Iranian People's Fedaian-Majority Left Wing," led by Moṣṭafā Madani, an offshoot of the Organization of Iranian People's Fedaian (Majority) that had broken away from the latter in October 1980.

=== Organization of Iranian People's Fedai Guerrillas – Followers of the Identity Platform ===
The Organization of Iranian People's Fedai Guerrillas – Followers of the Identity Platform is an Iranian communist group based in exile. It was formed in 1983 as a split from the Organization of Iranian People's Fedai Guerrillas (Minority).

=== Communist Party of Iran ===
The Communist Party of Iran (CPI) is an Iranian communist party founded on 2 September 1983. It has an armed wing, and its membership is predominantly Kurdish. It was formed from a merger between the Marxist–Leninist Komala Party of Iranian Kurdistan and three related Iranian leftist organizations: Sahand, the Union of Communist Militants, and a faction of Peykar. The party would suffer a split in 1991, when former party leader Mansoor Hekmat formed the Worker-communist Party of Iran over issues regarding left-wing nationalism. The CPI is active throughout the industrialized areas of Iran.

=== Organization of Iranian People's Fedai Guerrillas (1985) ===
The Organization of Iranian People's Fedai Guerrillas (1985) is an Iranian communist group. It was formed in 1985 as a split from the Organization of Iranian People's Fedai Guerrillas (Minority). The organization is currently banned in Iran.

=== Worker-communist Party of Iran ===
The Worker-communist Party of Iran was founded in 1991 that seeks the overthrow of the Islamic Republic of Iran and the establishment of a Socialist Republic in its place. The party's primary slogans are "Liberty, Equality, Workers' Rule", "Down with the Islamic Republic", "For a Socialist Republic" and "The Basis of Socialism is the Human Being". WPI was formed by dissenting members of the Communist Party of Iran. The main founder and leader of the party was Mansoor Hekmat, who died on July 4th, 2002.

After the death of Mansoor Hekmat in 2002, there was a debate in the party over whether a new leader should be announced or not. This led to the formation of two factions, one centred on Hamid Taqvaee, who was defending "Collective Leadership", the other around Koroosh Modaressi who believed that party should choose a leader immediately. The Central Committee subsequently voted for immediate election of a leader. Taqvaee and Modaressi nominated themselves and Koroosh Modaressi was chosen. The leadership debates eventually led to the exodus of more than half of the members of Central Committee and most of the Kurdistan Committee in August 2004. The defectors chose the leadership of Koroosh Modaressi, who was then Chairperson of the Political Bureau. This move was supported by the leadership of the Worker-Communist Party of Iraq. Together they formed a new party called the Worker-Communist Party of Iran-Hekmatist. They claim to be closer to the ideas of Mansoor Hekmat, though this is denied by the leadership of the WPI, who declared themselves to be the real followers of Hekmat's ideas.

== See also ==
- Anarchism in Iran
- Cultural Revolution in Iran
- 1981–1982 Iran massacres
- 1988 executions of Iranian political prisoners
