= Left Worker-communist Party of Iraq =

Left Worker-communist Party of Iraq الحزب الشيوعي العمالي اليساري العراقي
- Chairperson: Samir Noory
- Founded: 2004
- Split from: Worker-communist Party of Iraq
- Ideology: Workerism; Communism; Third camp
- Political position: Far-left

The Left Worker-communist Party of Iraq (Arabic: الحزب الشيوعي العمالي اليساري العراقي) is a small political party in Iraq, formed in 2004.

The party was formed by a group of communists, some of whom were members in the Worker-Communist Party of Iraq soon after the WCPIraq decided to support the Worker-Communist Party of Iran - Hekmatist; the Left tendency was to desire to maintain links with the Worker-Communist Party of Iran, believing that group held to a clear revolutionary and socialist position and maintained the line of Worker Communism as laid out by its founder, Mansoor Hekmat.

The former leader of LWPI is Issam Shukri. He was also a member of Central Committee and Politburo of WPI. The current secretary of the central committee is Samir Noory.

The party opposed the Criminalization of homosexuality in Iraq, and called for the acceptance of the LGBTQ community.
