= Worker-communist Party of Kurdistan =

Worker-communist Party of Kurdistan حزبی کۆمۆنیستی کرێکاریی کوردستان
- Chairperson: Osman Hajy Marouf
- Founded: 2008
- Split from: Worker-communist Party of Iraq
- Headquarters: Suleymaniyah
- Ideology: Marxism; Workerism; Communism; Third camp
- Influenced by: Mansoor Hekmat

Website
- hkkurdistan.org

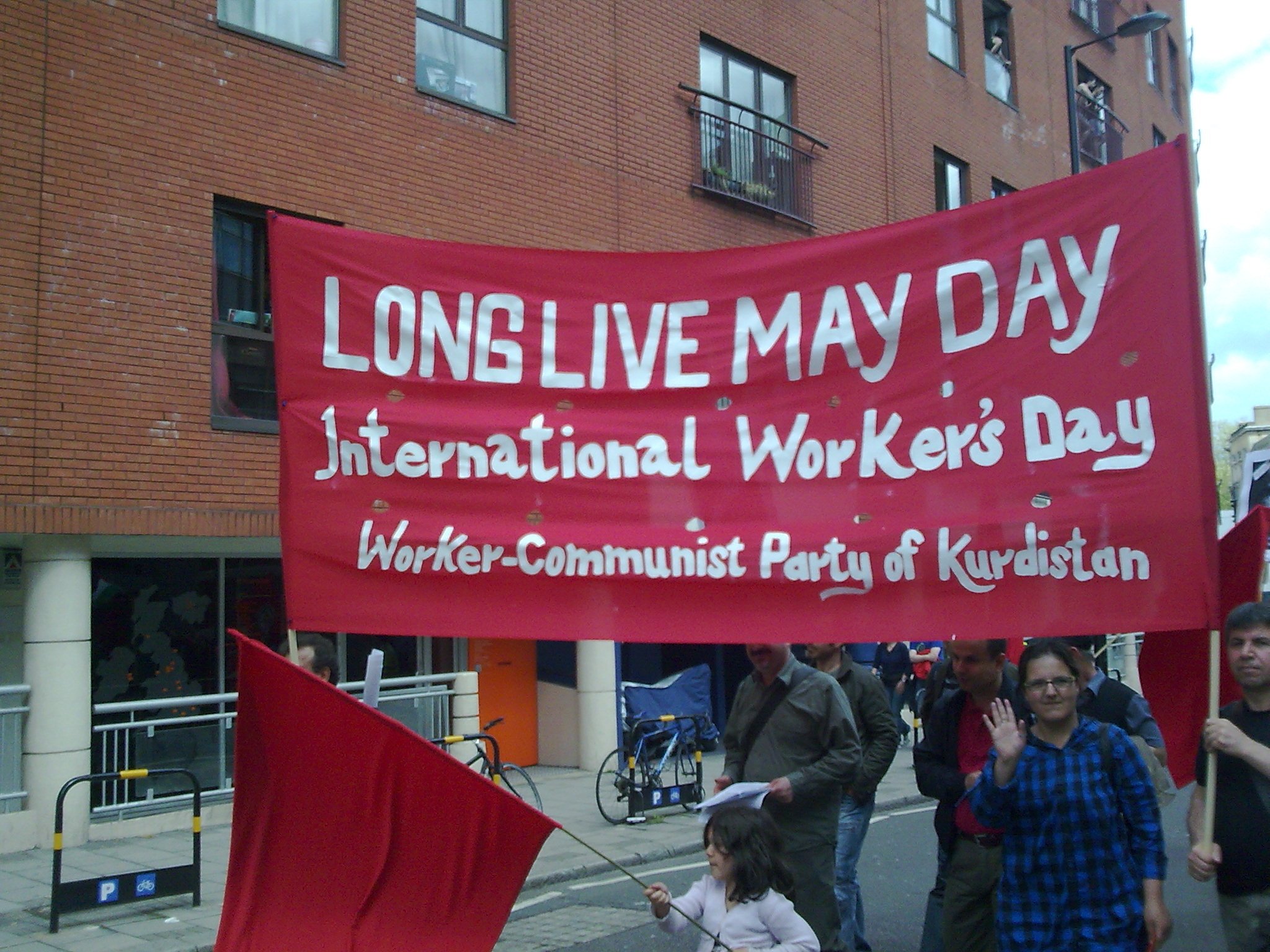
Worker-communist party of Kurdistan's banner for London's Mayday, 2010

The Worker-communist Party of Kurdistan (Kurdish: حزبی کۆمۆنیستی کرێکارییکوردستان, romanized: Hizbî Komonîstî Krêkarî Kurdistan) is a Marxist political party in Iraqi Kurdistan. The party was established in March 2008 when the Kurdistan branch of the Worker-communist Party of Iraq was formed into a separate party. The groups that had formed the Worker-communist Party of Iraq in 1993 had established a presence in Silêmanî after the 1991 Iraqi uprisings in the form of workers' councils, which were only short-lived though. It succeeded to establish an office in Erbil, but attempts to organize in Badînan largely failed due to pressure from the Kurdistan Democratic Party.

The party is currently led by Osman Hajy Marouf. It is a sister party of the Worker-communist Party of Iraq and previously WPK had a good relations with Worker-communist Party of Iran – Hekmatist.

The party's main office is in the Suleymaniyah city. The party is also very active among Iraqi Kurdish exiles; its head of abroad committee is based in the UK. It also has branches in Australia, Canada, Finland, Sweden, Norway, Denmark, Netherlands, Germany, Italy and Turkey. The party has never taken part in an election for the Kurdistan Region Parliament.

WPK produce a newspaper twice a month, called October. It also has a radio station, called Radio Peshang.

== Kurdish spring 2011 ==
The party had a leading role in the 2011 protests in the Suleymaniyah city. Nawzad Baban, member of politburo, was one of the leaders of the protests. He was kidnapped by ruling government with some other party members and released after several days.

Shortly after the protests Worker-communist Party of Kurdistan was officially recognized by the Kurdistan Regional Government. The party rejected several times to receive any budget from the government though.

== Later developments ==
In late 2018, Cebar Mistefa, one of the members of the party's Central Committee, died in Australia after a struggle against cancer. Mistefa had reportedly played a role in organizing the 1991 Iraqi uprisings, but later went into exile in Australia.

In 2020, the party called on the government of the Kurdistan Region to step down due to the failure of premier Masrour Barzani to pay the salaries of public servants, and other shortcomings. It also accused the KDP-led government of misusing measures against the Corona pandemic as a means to remain in power. The party also argued that the system is not reformable and called for a revolution by the means of popular uprising, in order to establish a socialist rule.

In 2022, the party condemned the Turkish military's operations against Kurdish militants in the Kurdistan Region as aggression, and called on the population to stop the assaults of the Turkish occupation. In a protest event in Silêmanî on 21 July 2022, the party commemorated the civilian victims of the Turkish airstrikes. In a speech, the party member Mehmud Helaq called Turkey a fascist state willing to kill hundreds or thousands of civilians for its military gains.

== See also ==
- Worker-communist Party of Iraq
- Worker-communist Party of Iran
- Worker-communist Party of Iran – Hekmatist
- Mansoor Hekmat
