= Communist Party of Iran (disambiguation) =

The Communist Party of Iran is an Iranian communist party founded on 2 September 1983.

Communist Party of Iran may also refer to:

- Communist Party of Persia created from Adalat Party in 1920
- Communist Party of Iran (Marxist–Leninist–Maoist), founded in 2001
- Tudeh Party of Iran, founded in 1941
- Worker-communist Party of Iran, founded in 1991
