= Azar Majedi =

Iranian communist activist and writer

Azar Majedi (Persian: آذر ماجدی) is an Iranian communist activist, writer, and one of the leaders of the Worker-Communist Party of Iran. She has opposed the current regime ruling Iran since returning from her education abroad to oppose the regime in 1978, a movement she has described as 'just'.

Majedi was born in Iran to an atheist father and a Muslim mother.

== Political views ==
Majedi describes herself as Marxist and Worker-communist. An atheist from the age of 12, she has described Islam as "a very misogynist ideology".

In another interview Majedi expressed the view that although racism towards Muslims is ripe and natural, 'Islamophobia' is "an invented concept trying to silence the world to criticize Islam or Islamic movement".

== Personal life ==
Majedi was married to the late Iranian Marxist, revolutionary, and leader of the Worker-communist Party of Iran (WPI) Mansoor Hekmat. Together they have three children.
