= Koorosh Modaressi =

Iranian politician (born 1950)

Koorosh Modaressi (born 1950 in Sanandaj, Iran) is the founder, general secretary of the central committee and leader (as of 2008) of the Worker-Communist Party of Iran - Hekmatist. He was a founder of the Worker-Communist Party of Iran in 1991, from which his current party split.
