= Avetis Sultan-Zade =

Persian-born ethnic Armenian communist and economist (1889–1938)

- Born: Avetis Mikaelian; 1889; Maragheh, Qajar Iran
- Died: 16 July 1938 (aged 48–49); Soviet Union
- Political party: Communist Party of Iran

Avetis Sultanovich Sultan-Zade (born Avetis Mikaelian; Russian: Аветис Султанович Султан-Заде; Persian: آوتيس سلطانزاده; Armenian: Ավետիս Սուլթան Զադե; 1889 – 16 July 1938) was an Iranian-born ethnic Armenian communist revolutionary and economist, best remembered as one of the founders of the Communist Party of Iran. Sultan-Zade was a delegate to the Second World Congress of the Communist International in 1920 and was for a time one of the leading figures of the Marxist revolutionary movement in the so-called "East." Following his demotion from the leadership of the Iranian Communist Party and the Comintern in 1923, Sultan-Zada lived in the Soviet Union where he worked as a government functionary in the banking industry.

During the Great Terror of the late 1930s, Sultan-Zade came under the suspicion of the secret police. He was arrested in January 1938 and jailed for five months before being tried and shot as an alleged spy. He was posthumously rehabilitated in 1956.

== Biography ==
=== Early years ===
Avetis Sultan-Zade was born Avetis Mikaelian in 1889 in the Iranian town of Maragheh, located in East Azerbaijan, a province in the northwestern part of the current Iran. The Mikaelians were a poor family of Armenian extraction and were not Muslim.

Mikaelian was first educated in his hometown in Persia before leaving for the Russian Empire in 1907. Mikaelian was enrolled in a seminary near the city Erevan, Armenia (then part of the Russian Empire), where he first became involved in radical politics through participation in Marxist study circles established amongst the students.

=== Early political career ===
Mikaelian joined the Bolshevik Party in 1912, probably in the Russian city of Saint Petersburg, where he seems to have completed his higher education. He subsequently worked in various capacities as a party functionary in the Caucasus. It is likely during this interval of underground activity that he began to use the party name "A. Sultan-Zade."

Following the victory of the Bolsheviks in the October Revolution of 1917, Sultan-Zade turned his effort towards organizing the Communist movement in Persia. He was dispatched to Central Asia to attempt to build the Communist Party of Persia among the émigré workers there. In 1919 Sultan-Zade joined the Adalat Party (Justice Party), a Persian Marxist political party. Sultan-Zade traveled organizing local affiliates of the Adalat Party as well as the group's first political conference, held in Tashkent. He was also appointed head of a "Special Section" of the fledgling Communist International in charge of producing revolutionary propaganda for the semi-colonial nations of Asia bordering Russia.

Sultan-Zade continued this activity into the ranks of the Communist Party of Iran, acting as one of the chief organizers of the founding convention of this organization, held in the northern port city of Bandar-e Anzali in June 1920. Sultan-Zade was elected Secretary of the Persian communist organization and served as its delegate to the Second World Congress of the Communist International in Moscow. He was elected to the Executive Committee of the Communist International (ECCI) by the 2nd World Congress as the designated representative of the nationalities of the Middle East.

Sultan-Zade was the leader of the radical wing of the Communist Party of Iran and was an advocate of immediate land reform in opposition to more moderate nationalist forces following the Soviet landing at Anzali and their short-lived establishment of a Soviet Socialist Republic in Gilan in 1920. Sultan-Zade was an opponent of collaboration with the charismatic leader Mirza Kuchek Khan, head of the nationalist Jangali movement.

In September 1920, Sultan-Zade attended the Comintern-organized Congress of the Peoples of the East in Baku, at which a new 48-member "Council for Action and Propaganda in the East" was elected. He does not seem to have played a leading role at this gathering, perhaps owing to factional differences within the Iranian delegation. He did serve in the capacity of translator, however, rendering Russian into Turkish.

Sultan-Zade published his first book in 1920, called by one historian "the only book published by the Comintern about the League of Nations." In this work, Ekonomicheskaia politika finansogo kapitala (The Political Economy of Finance-Capital), Sultan-Zade outlined the struggle of national bourgeoisies to compete for foreign markets, tying international political institutions with the struggle for resources and markets. Sultan-Zade also found an international audience for the first time with the publication of two articles in Communist International, the official organ of the Comintern, as well as two published reports on the foundation of the Communist Party of Iran.

By the end of 1920 Sultan-Zade had emerged as a leading voice on the left wing of the world communist movement who eschewed collaboration with non-communist nationalist leaders, believing instead that imminent revolution would cast aside such movements seeking accommodation with international capitalism. This orientation brought him into conflict with elements in the Comintern who sought to work closely with such popular nationalist leaders.

Sultan-Zade was again a delegate to the 1921 3rd World Congress of the Comintern, at which he was returned to his seat on the governing Executive Committee of the Comintern. He was also a delegate to the 2nd Enlarged Plenum of ECCI in June 1922 and to the 4th World Congress of the Comintern, held in Moscow that same November. While it seems that Sultan-Zade was returned as a representative to the ECCI by the 3rd World Congress, after 1922 Sultan-Zade no longer was the decisive figure in determining the political line of the Communist Party of Iran.

=== Soviet functionary ===
Hailing from the oil-rich Caspian basin seems to have led Sultan-Zade to interest in the "oil question" and the growing importance of this basic commodity. This study lead Sultan-Zade to the publication of his second full-length book, Krizis mirogo khoziaistva i novaia voennaia groza (The crisis of the world economy and the new threat of war), published in Moscow. In addition a synopsis of this book was published in article form in the pages of the multi-lingual magazine Communist International.

Sultan-Zade wrote a series of articles in 1922 relating to various issues relating to the political and economic situation in Iran, India, and China, including pieces on the peasantry, the battle of the capitalist powers to obtain oil in the region, and the matter of industrialization of these largely undeveloped nations.

While Sultan-Zade was again a delegate to the 3rd Enlarged Plenum of ECCI in June 1923, this marked the end of his participation in the top leadership of the Persian Communist Party and the Comintern apparatus. At this time Sultan-Zade moved to administrative work in the Soviet government, at the same time writing several pamphlets and books on economics and regional politics. His primary area of work related to administration of the Soviet banking system. Sultan-Zade also seems to have been sent to the Plekhanov Institute, an advanced training school for high-ranking Comintern functionaries, during the middle 1920s.

Sultan-Zade continued to work in the Soviet banking apparatus until 1927, taking time in 1926 to edit a financial reference book prepared in conjunction with a number of Soviet economists. He was also called upon at least once to provide expert analysis on Iranian events. Despite his presence at a December 1925 meeting on the Iranian situation, Sultan-Zada was not regarded as a leading voice on Iranian affairs after his removal from ECCI in 1923, having been replaced by a new cohort of Russian specialists on the region.

=== Return to Persian politics ===
A radical turn of the Communist International away from temporizing with non-communist nationalist movements paved the way for Sultan-Zade's return to the political leadership of the Iranian Communist Party in 1927. In that year Sultan-Zade was once again made part of the governing Central Committee of the Communist Party of Iran, marking a return to the leadership circle of that organization. Sultan-Zade was again elected a delegate to the 6th World Congress of the Comintern, held in Moscow in 1928.

Sultan-Zade was removed from the leadership of the Iranian Communist Party in 1932 and later expelled. He returned to work in the Soviet economic apparatus following his expulsion from the Persian party. According to a 1984 journal article by his biographer, Sultan-Zade's activities after this date become "difficult, if not completely impossible, to trace."

=== Arrest and execution ===
Sultan-Zade was arrested in Moscow by the secret police on January 17, 1938, on charges of "espionage". After five months of imprisonment and interrogation he was found guilty of being a "spy for Nazi Germany" on June 18, 1938 and sentenced to be shot. The sentence was carried out that same day.

=== Legacy ===
In 1956 during a review of the crimes and abuses of the Soviet secret police during the Stalin period, Sultan-Zade's case was reviewed. On June 9, 1956, Sultan-Zade was formally cleared of the 1938 charges which led to his execution and legal rights were restored to his heirs through posthumous rehabilitation.

A volume of Sultan-Zade's political writings was published in German translation in 1975.

== Works ==
- Экономичeская политика финансового капитала (The political economy of finance-capital). Moscow: Gosudarstvennoe izdatel'stvo, 1920.
- Экономика и проблемы национальных революций в странах ближнего и дальнего Востока (Economics and the problems of national revolution in the countries of the Near and Far East). Moscow: Gosudarstvennoe izdatel'stvo, 1921.
- Кризис мирового хозяйства и новая военная гроза (The crisis of the world economy and the new threat of war). Moscow: Gosudarstvennoe izdatel'stvo, 1921.
- Современная Персия (Contemporary Persia). Moscow: n.p., 1922.
- Аграрный вопрос в современная Персии (The agrarian question in contemporary Persia). Moscow: n.p., 1922.
- Колониальный восток: Социально-экономические очерки (The Colonial East: Socio-Economic Studies). (Editor). Moscow: Novaia Moskva, 1924.
- Железо, уголь и нефть и мировая борьба за них (Iron, coal, and oil and the global struggle for them). Leningrad: n.p., 1924.
- Персия (Persia). Moscow: Gosudarstvennoe izdatel'stvo, 1925.
- Колониальный страны и мировая хозяйства (The colonial nations and world economy). Moscow: 1928.
