= Haydar Khan Amo-oghli =

Iranian revolutionary (1880–1921)

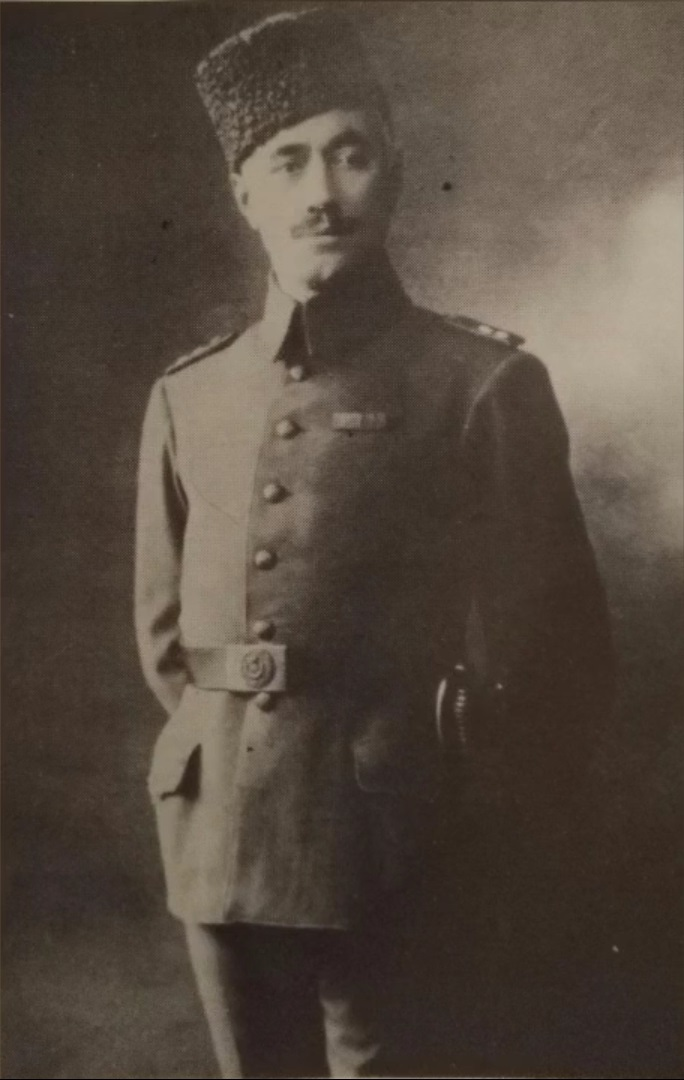
- Born: 20 December 1880; Urmia, Sublime State of Iran or Russian Armenia, Russian Empire
- Died: 15 October 1921 (aged 41); Gilan, Sublime State of Iran
- Political party: Communist Party (1917–1921)
- Other political affiliations: Democrat Party (1910–1917); Social Democratic Party (1904–1910)

Haydar Khan Amo-oghli Tariverdi (Persian: حیدرخان عمواوغلی تاریوردی; 20 December 1880 – 15 October 1921) was an Iranian communist revolutionary, key figure during the Persian Constitutional Revolution and among the founders of the Communist Party of Persia. During the Minor Tyranny, Heydar Khan Amu-Oghli sent a number of volunteer fedayeen to fight against Mohammad Ali Shah and assist the constitutionalist fighters in Tabriz. He himself also travelled to Tabriz.

He was involved in many of the revolutionary events of the Persian Constitutional Revolution:

- The assassination of Amin al-Sultan, the prime minister under Mozaffar al-Din Shah.
- Bombing the house of Ala al-Dawla.
- An assassination attempt on Mohammad Ali Shah
- Killing Shoja Nezam Marandi, the governor of Marand with a homemade bomb.
- Founding the Communist Party of Iran. At the First Congress of the Peoples of the East, on 9 September 1920, he assumed the leadership of the Central Committee of the newly established party.

Heydar Khan continued his revolutionary activities after the capture of Tehran. Eventually, his place of residence was discovered. On the orders of Yeprem Khan, he was exiled. Heydar Khan travelled to Russia and from there to France and Switzerland, where he joined Lenin’s associates.

When the Jangal Movement began, he established contact with its members. In May 1921, after lengthy negotiations, he made it possible to sign an agreement with Mirza Kuchik Khan on renewed cooperation. Following disagreements and internal conflicts within the Jangal Movement, Heydar Khan was surrounded in a village in Gilan called Mian-Raz and killed by Mirza Kuchik Khan and his men. His date of death is given as 15 October 1921.

== Early years ==
A member of the Iranian Tariverdiev family, Haydar was the son of a certain Ali-Akbar. He was generally referred to as "Amo-oghli", a nickname he later in his life received by the workers in Baku. It is uncertain where he was born. Some sources consider Urmia in northwestern Iran to have been his birthplace, while the Iranian historian Abdul-Hadi Hairi consider him to have been born in Russian Armenia. He was raised in Alexandropol in Russian Armenia, where his family had resettled.

It was in Alexandropol that Haydar started his education, continuing his studies in higher institutions in Yerevan and then Tbilisi, where he graduated in 1899 with a degree in electrical engineering. In his memoirs, Haydar claimed to have been politically active since the age of 12. He was introduced to the Russian Social Democratic Labour Party and a group of socialists in 1898 while he was still a student in Tbilisi. In 1901, he became a member of the Baku branch of the Russian Social Democratic Labour Party.

== In Mashhad ==
Haydar Khan arrived in Iran as an inexperienced young man with no knowledge of Persian and was unfamiliar with Iranian society and culture, but was driven to action by his restlessness, his sense of mission, and a belief in his exceptional love for Iran and the Iranians. Upon humiliating an official (Saham ol mulk Motavalibashi) in Khorasan, he comments in his memoirs, "I had only one purpose in mind, which was to show the people of Khorasan (Iran) who had little or no education and understanding that [the official] was also an ordinary human being." He remained 15 months in Mashhad and after that he went to Tehran as the engineer of Haj Amin Al-zarb electrical plant.

== In Tehran ==
He arrived in Tehran in 1903, where the Persian Constitutional Revolution was about to unfold. He may have exaggerated his role in the Constitutional Revolution when he claimed that he was the one who sent the first group of people to take refuge on the grounds of the British Embassy. However, upon the death of Mozaffar ad-Din Shah and the accession of Mohammad Ali Shah, Haydar Khan, now more experienced and knowledgeable, played a significant role in moving Iranian politics in a radical direction.

On the very day that the Anglo-Russian Agreement was signed in St. Petersburg in 1907, bisecting Iran into two spheres of influence, Ali Asghar Khan, the powerful Iranian premier, was shot in front of the Majles. Haydar Khan admitted that he had masterminded the assassination, and this was confirmed by Hassan Taqizadeh, who, however, denies that there had existed a Terror Committee on whose orders Haydar Khan committed the act. Ali Asghar Khan had just persuaded the Shah to work with Parliament, where he had a strong enough base to guarantee its cooperation. As a result of his death, the parliamentary coalition he had constructed quickly evaporated. Moreover, the Shah became more suspicious of Parliament, and, as the politicized crowd saw the revolutionary potential of prime minister's removal, Parliament became less willing to accommodate the Shah. The lines became sharply drawn, increasing the likelihood of violent conflict.

Other members of the political elite who attempted to bridge the gap between the Shah and the Constitutionalists were also the targets of Haydar Khan's political terrorism. These included Mirza Ahmad Khan Ala-al-Dawla and the Khedmat Society, which included members of the old regime who professed Constitutionalist sympathies. However, the most radical attack by Haydar Khan took place on 28 February 1908, when a bomb was thrown at the Shah's motorcade. Haydar Khan who by that time became known under the pseudonym "Bombist" for his terrorist activities, was found responsible for the plot and was arrested, but he was soon released at the insistence of his parliamentary Social Democrat comrades. This single act of violence was followed by the Shah's closing of Parliament. The Shah and the Constitutionalists now stood against each other, and both sides were armed. Consequently, in 1909, for the first time in the Middle East, a monarch was dethroned in the name of the people.

During this conflict, Haydar Khan first escaped to Caucasia, where he helped in the provision of men and material for the revolutionaries, before returning to fight them. Once the Shah had been dethroned, he joined the radical Democratic Party and organized the assassination in January 1910 of Ayatollah Mirza Sayyed Abdullah Behbahani, who led the conservative wing of the Constitutionalists.

Later, Haydar Khan, in support of the Democrats and the governmental forces during the government of the popular Mirza Hasan Khan Mostawfi-al-Mamalek, participated in attacks against the Sattar Khan and Baqer Khan and Mojahed groups, veterans of the armed struggle during the Constitutional revolution who were now providing military support for the Conservatives. Haydar Khan and the Democrats supported Yeprem Khan, the Armenian head of the police force, and succeeded in disarming them. Sattar Khan died soon afterwards as a consequence of an injury he sustained in action.

In March 1911, Haydar Khan was forced to leave Iran. The Conservatives had regrouped, and the Russians, who invaded Iran and occupied Azerbaijan, did not wish to permit a revolutionary neighbor on their border. After obtaining money from the deposed Shah in Russia (by pretending that he would help restore him, the Shah, to his former throne), Haydar Khan left for Europe.

== Death ==
The 1917 Russian Revolution provided an opportunity for Haydar Khan to return to the Caucasus and participate in the Baku Congress in 1921 as one of the leaders of the Iranian delegation. Haydar Khan was sent back to Iran by the Bolsheviks to settle the conflict which was raging between the Jangalis and the Communist Party of Persia in Gilan. Although accounts of this episode vary in their account of the details, it is almost certain that he was killed by a group of Jangalis quickly afterwards, with or without Mirza Kuchek's knowledge. Following this, his body was extensively embalmed and smuggled out of the country to France.

== Sources ==
- Hairi, Abdul-Hadi (1971). "Ḥaydar K̲h̲ān Amū Ug̲h̲lī". In Lewis, B.; Ménage, V. L.; Pellat, Ch. & Schacht, J. (eds.). The Encyclopaedia of Islam, Second Edition. Volume III: H–Iram. Leiden: E. J. Brill. OCLC 495469525.
- Sheikholeslami, A. (2020). "Ḥaydar Khan ʿAmu-Oḡli". Encyclopaedia Iranica Online. Brill. doi:10.1163/2330-4804_EIRO_COM_2899.
- Tare, Masoud (2018). "حیدرعمو اوغلی". The Great Islamic Encyclopaedia (in Persian).
