= Peykar (1931 newspaper) =

Theoretical journal

- Launched: 1931
- Ceased publication: 1932
- Political alignment: Communist Party of Persia
- Language: Persian
- Country: Iran
- OCLC number: 1007744155

Peykar (Persian: پیکار, lit. 'Combat') was the theoretical journal of the Communist Party of Persia.

It was first published in Berlin in 1931 and lasted for 15 issues until 1932, when it was published in Vienna. The newspaper claimed that it was published abroad because communists were prosecuted inside Iran.

Peykar was run by a coalition of Iranian left-wing activists and intellectuals, including Morteza Alavi. According to Younes Jalali, it is unlikely that Taghi Arani had ever contributed to the publication, because of its "cacophony" and journalistic style that included "more blows than hard analysis".
