= Unified Socialist Party (Persia) =

Socialiste Unifié
- Founder: Ali Akbar Dehkhoda
- Split from: Moderate Socialists
- Merged into: Moderate Socialists
- Ideology: Socialism

The Unified Socialists (Persian: اجتماعیون اتحادیون, romanized: Ejtemāʿīyūn-e Etteḥādīyūn) or the Socialiste Unifié (Persian: سوسیالیست اونیفه) was a political party in constitutional period Persia.
