= Constitutional Revolution =

Constitutional Revolution may refer to:

- Constitutional Revolution (Israel), legislation passed by the Israeli Knesset from 1992 to 1995 on human rights and the basis of the Supreme Court's powers of judicial review
- Persian Constitutional Revolution, the revolution in Persia (Iran) between 1905 and 1911 that led to the establishment of a parliament during the Qajar dynasty
- Constitutionalist Revolution of 1932, the uprising of the population of the Brazilian state of São Paulo against the Brazilian Revolution of 1930
