= Communist Party of Iran =

Communist political party in Iran

Communist Party of Iran حزب کمونیست ایران
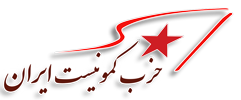
- Abbreviation: CPI
- Leadership: Central committee
- Founder: Abdulla Mohtadi; Mansoor Hekmat
- Founded: 2 September 1983 in Iranian Kurdistan
- Merger of: • Komalah; • EMK; • Peykar (faction)
- Newspaper: Jahān-e Emrūz (World Today)
- Kurdish organization: Komala (CPI)
- Armed wing: Peshmerga Forces
- Ideology: Communism; Revolutionary socialism
- Political position: Far-left
- National affiliation: Cooperation Council of Left and Communist Parties
- Slogan: "Workers of all countries, unite!"

Website
- www.cpiran.org

The Communist Party of Iran (CPI; Persian: حزب کمونیست ایران) is an Iranian communist party founded on 2 September 1983. It has an armed wing and its membership is predominantly Kurdish. The CPI is active throughout the urban and industrialized areas of Iran.

== History ==
The Communist Party of Iran was founded in 1983, in Iranian Kurdistan. It was formed from a merger between the Marxist–Leninist Komala Party of Iranian Kurdistan and other related Iranian leftist organizations: Union of Communist Militants (formerly Sahand), and a faction of Peykar. Prior to the merger, Komala was considered to be a strictly Maoist party. The CPI, however, has been critical of Mao as a revolutionary, considering that he made many mistakes throughout the 1950s to 1970s. The party opposes the government of the Islamic Republic of Iran. The CPI also rejects the policies of the Tudeh Party of Iran from the late 1950s and onward, citing a particular grievance with Tudeh giving support to the Shahs of Iran and Ayatollah Khomeini's regime. CPI also emphasizes that the Soviet Union was not a socialist government after the death of Stalin.

The party split in 1991 when former party leader Mansoor Hekmat formed the Worker-communist Party of Iran over issues regarding left-wing nationalism.

During the 2025-2026 Iranian protests, the party published a statement on the establishment of a supposed "workers' councils" in the city of Arak.

== Ideology ==
The CPI currently advocates for increased civil, political, and social rights in Iran, as well as improved labour laws and protections for workers.

The party has representations in Germany (Cologne and Frankfurt), Finland, Sweden (Göteborg and Stockholm), Norway, Denmark (Copenhagen), the United Kingdom (London), Australia, and Canada (Toronto).

=== Structure ===
The CPI organizationally follows the Marxist-Leninist principle of democratic centralism.

== See also ==
- Communist Party of Iran (Marxist–Leninist–Maoist)
- Worker-communist Party of Iran
- Worker-communist Party of Iran - Hekmatist
