= Social Reformers Party =

- Ideology: Socialism

The Social Reformers Party (Persian: فرقه اصلاحیون عامیون, romanized: Ferqa'ye Eṣlāḥīyūn-e ʿāmmīyūn) was a small socialist party in Persia during the constitutional period. It was considered to follow a moderate line in comparison to the Democrat Party and the Social Democratic Party's economic platform, but opposed the landlords likewise.
