= Union of Communist Militants =

Union of Communist Militants اتحاد مبارزان کمونیست
- Founder: Mansoor Hekmat
- Founded: 1979
- Dissolved: 1983
- Succeeded by: Communist Party of Iran
- Ideology: Maoism
- Political position: Far-left

Union of Communist Militants (Persian: اتحاد مبارزان کمونیست, abbreviated EMK امک) was an Iranian communist group. It was led by Mansoor Hekmat. Hekmat founded the group in December 1978. The organization took part in the Iranian Revolution of 1979 — marked by the creation of workers' councils (shoras).

Because of mounting repression in Iran, the organisation sought refuge in Kurdistan in 1981. In Kurdistan, the organization merged with a Kurdish group of Maoist roots, Komala Party of Iranian Kurdistan. Together, they formed the Communist Party of Iran (CPI) in September 1983.
