= Socialist Revolutionary Party (Persia) =

- Founded: 1900s
- Headquarters: Baku, Caucasus
- Newspaper: Ekinçi ve Fe'le
- Ideology: Revolutionary socialism

Socialist Revolutionary Party (Persian: فرقه اجتماعیون انقلابیون, romanized: Ferqa'ye Ejtemāʿīyūn-e Enqelābīyūn), also known as Social-Revolutionaries (Persian: سوسیال‌رولوسیونرها, romanized: Sosyal-Revolusiyonerha) was a Persian revolutionary socialist party based in Baku, Caucasus. It was one of the most important parties established by the Persian emigrants in Transcaucasia during Qajar dynasty. The party published an Azerbaijani language newspaper twice a week, named Ekinçi ve Fe'le and edited by Hosayn Israfilbekov.
