= Communist Party of Persia =

1920–1921 Iranian communist party

Communist Party of Iran حزب کمونیست ایران
- General Secretary: Haydar Khan Amo-oghli
- First Secretary: Avetis Sultan-Zade
- Founded: 1920
- Banned: 1921
- Succeeded by: Tudeh Party of Iran
- Newspaper: Combat
- Youth wing: Young Communist League of Persia
- Ideology: Communism
- Political position: Far-left
- International affiliation: Communist International

The Communist Party of Persia (Persian: حزب کمونیست ایران, romanized: Ḥezb-e komūnīst-e Iran) was an Iranian communist party. Its leader was Armenian Iranian called Avetis Mikaleian aka Ahmad Sultanzadeh, Sultanzadeh. It had 6,000 members.

Its predecessor, the transnational socialist Adalat (Justice) party (Persian: فرقه عدالت, romanized: Ferqa'ye ʿEdālat) was formed in 1912 or in 1916 after the first Russian Revolution by Iranian radical immigrants in Baku. The Baku Adalat Party was officially established in 1917 by the former social democrats who supported Baku-based Bolsheviks. Adalat party participated in the Communist International in 1919 and was partially absorbed by Communist Party of Azerbaijan in 1920. Its Iranian part was renamed to the "Communist Party of Persia" or also "Communist Party of Iran" in 1920.

Haydar Khan Amo-oghli, one of the leaders of the Persian Constitutional Revolution, was elected as its general secretary. Its foundation came about as a result of the establishment of the Persian Socialist Soviet Republic, earlier that year, by Mirza Kuchik Khan and his Jangali ("Jungle Movement") insurgents.

The party was banned in 1921 (coinciding with the defeat of the Persian Socialist Soviet Republic), though members continued activities underground until the foundation of the Tudeh Party of Iran in 1941, which thereafter became the official communist party in the country.

The party suffered ideological divisions between the left-wing faction led by Avetis Sultan-Zade, which advocated for rapid agrarian reform and anti-feudal social transformation, and a more moderate faction led by Haydar Khan Amo-oghli, which favored a broader coalition with progressive nationalist forces like Reza Khan.
