= Worker-communist Party of Iraq =

Worker-Communist Party of Iraq الحزب الشيوعي العمالي العراقي
- Chairperson: Samir Adil
- Founded: 1993
- Ideology: Workerism; Communism
- Political position: Far-left

Website
- https://wp-iraq.com/

The Worker-Communist Party of Iraq (Arabic: الحزب الشيوعي العمالي العراقي, romanized: Hizb al-Shuyu'i al-'Ummali al-'Iraqi) is a Marxist political party in Iraq and amongst Iraqi exiles. Samir Adil is the current leader of the party. It was established in July 1993 through a merger of communist groups.

They opposed both Saddam Hussein and the American-led new administration. Under the Ba'athist regime, the group was persecuted, and so operated primarily in the Kurdistan region, and overseas in the United Kingdom and Australia (where they were among the founders of the Socialist Alliance).

The party was also persecuted in Kurdistan and went underground in 2000 after a number of attacks by Patriotic Union of Kurdistan.

They are involved in the Federation of Workers Councils and Unions in Iraq, the Organization of Women's Freedom in Iraq and the Union of the Unemployed in Iraq. They have produced a newsletter called Iraq Weekly' and an English newspaper called Forward.

It is a sister party of the Worker-Communist Party of Kurdistan and previously had a good relationship with Worker-Communist Party of Iran - Hekmatist. In March 2005, members of the WCPI, along with members of other groups and other individuals, formed the Iraq Freedom Congress with the purpose of forming a secular and democratic Iraq.

The party condemned the killing of gay Iraqis at the hands of Islamist militias. It also opposed the criminalization of homosexuality, calling for the acceptance of the queer community.

== Published works ==
- Batatu, Hanna. The Old Social Classes and New Revolutionary Movements of Iraq, London, al-Saqi Books. 1978, republished, 2004. ISBN 0-86356-520-4
- Salucci, Ilario. A People's History of Iraq: The Iraqi Communist Party, Workers' Movements and the Left 1923-2004. Haymarket Books (2005) ISBN 1-931859-14-0

== See also ==
- Worker-communist Party of Kurdistan
- Worker-communist Party of Iran
- Mansoor Hekmat
