= Worker-communist Party of Iran – Hekmatist =

Worker-communist Party of Iran – Hekmatist حزب کمونیست کارگری ایران-حکمتیست
- Chairperson: Jamal Kamangar
- Founder: Majority of central committee with leadership of Koorosh Modaressi
- Founded: 2004; 22 years ago
- Split from: Worker-communist Party of Iran
- Ideology: Communism; Workerism
- Political position: Left-wing
- National affiliation: Cooperation Council of Left and Communist Parties

Website
- hekmatist.org

The Worker-communist Party of Iran – Hekmatist is an opposition Iranian political party in exile. Its current secretary of central committee is Naser Moradi and its current Chair of the Politburo is Siavash Daneshvar.

== History ==
The WPI-Hekmatist was formed in 2004 after a major split from the Worker-communist Party of Iran (WPI). More than half of the WPI's Central Committee and almost all of its Kurdistan Committee joined the WPI-Hekmatist. The leadership of Worker-Communist Party of Iraq also supported this move and it is now the sister party of the WPI-Hekmatist. The other split was in 2012 under the same name Worker-Communist Party-Hekmatist.

The group claims to hold more closely to the line of Mansoor Hekmat, the WPI's founder, but this claim has been denied by the WPI leadership and the dispute between the two parties is still ongoing. WPI-H denounce the WPI leadership as enacting a "retreat to the traditional Left" and the WPI leadership call the WPI-H "a right-wing split" and sometimes in sarcasm "Anti-Hekmatist" or more recently "UnHekmatist".

The Hekmatist party has declared it to be their goal to establish a modern Communist mass party in Iran and organize a Socialist revolution as Marx had formulated it. They distinguish themselves from other "traditional Left" groups by emphasizing their organization's focus on an immediate task (to the vanguard of the social movement for a Socialist revolution), rather than merely being an "intellectually-enlightning sectarian organization".
