= Worker-communist Party of Iran =

Worker-communist Party of Iran حزب کمونیست کارگری ایران
- Chairperson: Hamid Taqvaee
- Founder: Mansoor Hekmat
- Founded: 1991; 35 years ago
- Split from: Communist Party of Iran
- Ideology: Communism; Workerism; Marxism
- Political position: Far-left

Website
- WPIran.org

The Worker-communist Party of Iran (Persian: حزب کمونیست کارگری ایران, romanized: hezb-e kommunist-e kârgari-ye Irân) is a political party founded in 1991 that seeks the overthrow of the Islamic Republic of Iran and the (re-)establishment of a Socialist Republic in its place. The party's primary slogans are "Liberty, Equality, Workers' Rule", "Down with the Islamic Republic", "For a Socialist Republic" and "The Basis of Socialism is the Human Being".

WPI owns a 24-hour TV station called New Channel, which broadcasts mainly in Persian, but includes some programming in English, Kurdish and Azeri Turkish. The Communist Youth Organization is the youth wing of WPI. The organization's current leader is Hamid Taqvaee.

== Status ==
WPI is banned in Iran, as are other parties opposed to the Islamic Republic. It nevertheless boasts members in worker, student, women and other sections of Iranian society. The party maintains a presence amongst the Iranian diaspora in Western countries; having official organizations in Germany, the UK, Sweden, Netherlands, Norway, France, Finland, Denmark, USA, Canada, Turkey and Australia. Using these countries as a base, the WPI works with Iranians worldwide to further its immediate aims to overthrow the Islamic Republic.

== History ==
=== Foundation ===
WPI was formed in 1991 after some members of the Communist Party of Iran left to form a new party. The main founder and leader of the party was Mansoor Hekmat, who died on July 4, 2002. The founding declaration of the party has four signatures: Mansoor Hekmat, Koorosh Modarresi, Reza Moghadam and Iraj Azarin. The latter three individuals have since left the party.

=== Debate on leadership ===
After the death of Mansoor Hekmat in 2002, there was a debate in the party over whether a new leader should be announced or not. This led to the formation of two factions, one centred on Hamid Taqvaee, who was defending "Collective Leadership", the other around Koroosh Modaressi who believed that party should choose a leader immediately. The Central Committee subsequently voted for immediate election of a leader. Taqvaee and Modaressi nominated themselves and Koroosh Modaressi was chosen.

During the 4th Congress of Party, Modaressi did not nominate himself for leadership again saying that he would like stand down in favor of Hamid Taqvaee who, as the only candidate, was then appointed automatically.

=== Major split in August 2004 ===
The leadership debates eventually led to the exodus of more than half of the members of Central Committee and most of the Kurdistan Committee in August 2004. The defectors chose the leadership of Koroosh Modaressi, who was then Chairperson of the Political Bureau. This move was supported by the leadership of the Worker-Communist Party of Iraq. Together they formed a new party called the Worker-Communist Party of Iran-Hekmatist. They claim to be closer to the ideas of Mansoor Hekmat, though this is denied by the leadership of the WPI, who declared themselves to be the real followers of Hekmat's ideas.

The conflict between the two parties is still ongoing and the WPI leadership sometimes sarcastically refer to the WPI-H as 'anti-Hekmatist'. In return the WPI-H claims that WPI represents a retreat to the "traditional left" and is a "populist" party.

== Publications and papers ==
The WPI's main newspaper is Anternasional (in Persian, International), an eight-page Persian publication which is published every Friday. However, the party is also responsible for the following publications: https://anternasional.com/wp/

- Javânân-e Kommunist (in Persian:Communist Youth), it used to being published every Tuesday (in Persian) this is the official paper of the Communist Youth Organisation;
- WPI Briefing, an official publication in English. Similar papers are also published in German and Dutch.
- Kârgar-e Kommunist (The Communist Worker), which mainly covers workers' issues.
- Workers in Iran, an English newsletter concerning the latest news from the workers' movement in Iran.
- Iskraa, a Persian paper published by the WPI Kurdistan Committee.http://iskraa.net

In March 2006 the WPI started a theoretical journal named Be Su-ye Sosialism (in Persian: به سوی سوسیالیسم Toward Socialism). The first issue was published in October 2008. In 2022 Keyva Javid started a daily publication named Journal in Farsi.https://journalfarsi.com/

== Participation in allied groups and campaigns ==
Since the establishment of the party, WPI members and cadres have created and joined many organisations and campaigns on different issues. Such organisations are usually very close to the party. These are as follows:

- The Communist Youth Organisation.
- The International Federation of Iranian Refugees, known as Hambastegi (solidarity) is a vast organisation that was formed before the establishment of WPI but today is close to party. IFIR is struggling for refugees' rights, especially those who come from Iran. IFIR has a weekly paper in Persian named Hambastegi Haftegi (Weekly Solidarity) and a monthly paper (also in Persian) named Hambastegi Mahane (Monthly Solidarity).
- Children First Now emerged from Children First (which was formed by Mansoor Hekmat and Soraya Shahabi) and is a campaign for children's rights in Iran. It publishes a Persian paper called Koodakan Moqadamand (Children are Precedent).
- The Marx Society of London was formed By Mansoor Hekmat and Koroosh Modarresi after a long series of debates following the major split in the WPI in August 2004. It is working closely with WPI. The Society concentrates on theoretical issues in Marxism. Other Marx Societies (also close to WPI) have been formed in other countries, such as Canada.
- Anjomane Zede din (Anti-Religion Society) is a secularist group formed in August 2005. it is very close to WPI and has its own paper, called in Persian, Sekolar.

== Sister parties ==
The Leftist Worker-Communist Party of Iraq (LWPI) which was formed in 2004 after the major split in the WPI. It is a sister party to WPI. The LWPI's Current Leader, Osam Shukri, is a member of Central Committee and politburo of WPI.
