= Mansoor Hekmat =

Iranian communist revolutionary (1951–2002)

- Hekmat in 2000
- Born: Zhoobin Razani; 4 June 1951; Tehran, Pahlavi Iran
- Died: 4 July 2002 (aged 51); United Kingdom
- Resting place: Highgate Cemetery, London
- Political party: Union of Communist Militants (1979-1983); Communist Party of Iran (1983-1991); Worker-communist Party of Iran (from 1991)
- Spouse: Azar Majedi

Mansoor Hekmat (Persian: منصور حکمت, born Zhoobin Razani Persian: ژوبین رازانی; 4 June 1951 – 4 July 2002) was an Iranian Marxist, revolutionary, and leader of the Worker-communist Party of Iran (WPI). He opposed Mohammad Reza Pahlavi and after the 1979 Revolution first founded the movement of Revolutionary Marxism and in 1983 co-founded the Communist Party of Iran, which was opposed to the Islamic Republic of Iran. In 1991, he separated from this party and founded the WPI, which he led until his death in 2002. He was the husband of fellow politician Azar Majedi.

== Life ==
=== Youth ===
Hekmat was born Zhoobin Razani on 4 June 1951. His father was a university economist and government employee, whilst his mother was a teacher and lawyer. After completing his primary and secondary education in Tehran, he moved to Shiraz, studying economics at Shiraz University.

Hekmat soon moved to the UK, studying economics further at the University of Kent before completing his Masters at the University of Bath. He moved to London in 1973, beginning his PhD at Birkbeck University. It was here that Hekmat first discovered Marxist ideas, studying under the supervision of Marxist theorist Ben Fine. Due to the sensitive nature of Marxist politics with the Iranian government at the time, Razani adopted the pen name of Hekmat, becoming a critic of what he saw as distorted versions of communism, including Russian communism, Chinese communism, the guerrilla warfare movement, social democracy, Trotskyism and nationalism among the left.

=== Revolutionary Activity ===
Hekmat founded the Union of Communist Militants in 1979, then took part in the Iranian Revolution of 1979 – marked by the creation of workers' councils (shoras) – and, unlike the major part of the Iranian left-wing, refused to pay allegiance to Islamism and Supreme Leader Ruhollah Khomeini. He denounced the "myth of a progressive national bourgeoisie".

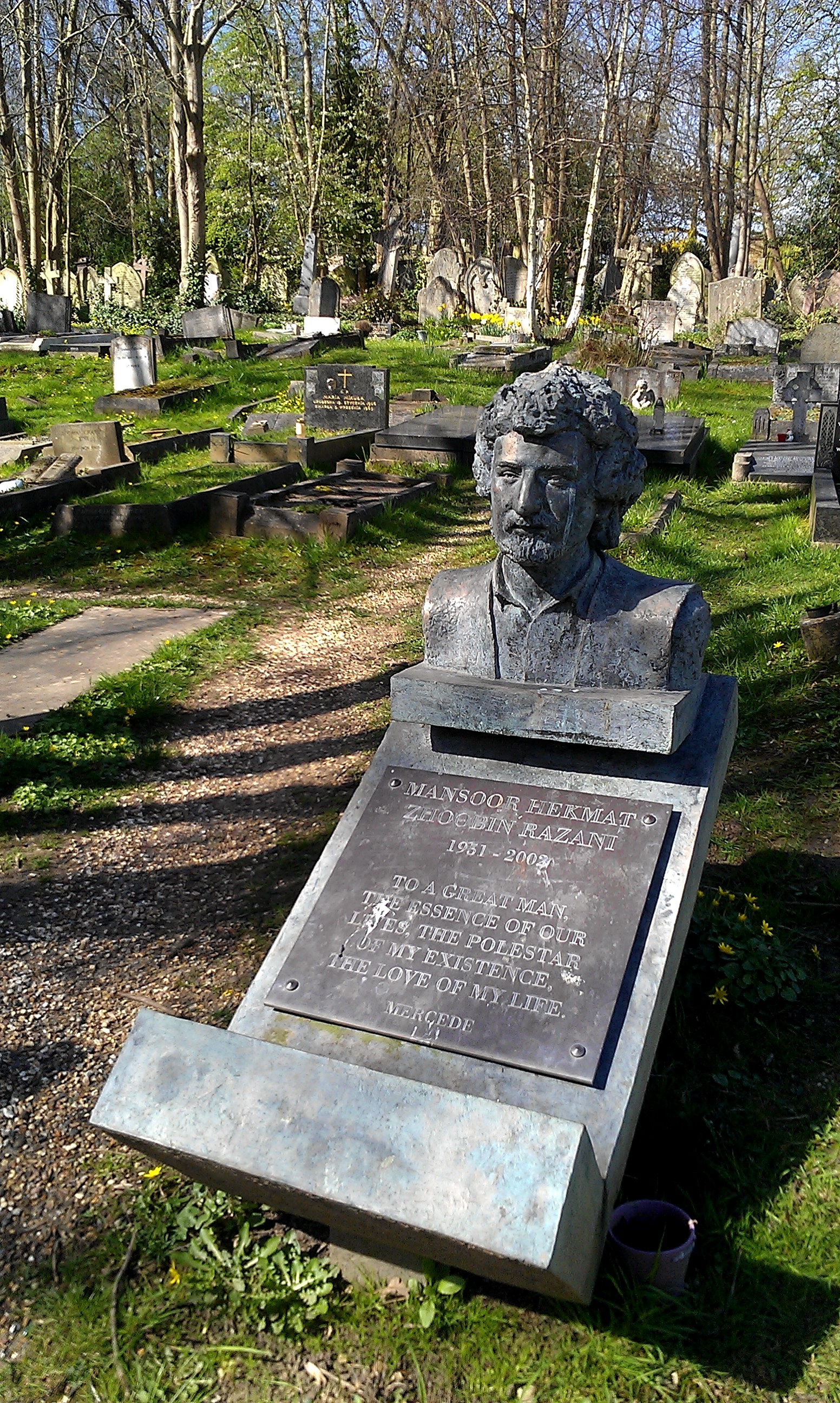
Hekmat's grave in London's Highgate Cemetery.

Because of mounting repression against political opposition groups in Iran, Hekmat sought refuge in Kurdistan in 1982. Hekmat's Union then fused with a Kurdish group of Maoist roots, Komalah – together, they formed the Communist Party of Iran (CPI) based on Revolutionary Marxism. Hekmat and a group of other CPI members left the party and, in 1991, founded the WPI. He also helped establish the Worker-Communist Party of Iraq.

== Death ==
Hekmat died on 4 July 2002, following a year-long battle with cancer in hospital in the UK. His headstone is in Highgate Cemetery, a few meters away from Karl Marx's grave. A memorial session was held by his wife Majedi on the 28th July, alongside representatives from the Worker-communist Party of Iran, Iraq and the CPGB(PCC).

== Views ==
Hekmat supported the "return to Marx", and theorized that the working class is to rely only on itself – arguing that it had been the only class to impose beneficial changes in the 20th century. He opposed Stalinism and never accepted that either the Soviet Union or the People's Republic of China were socialist countries. He famously said the basis of socialism is "the human being". Hekmat was also a practicing vegetarian and towards the end of his life became vegan.

Hekmat believed in free, legalised abortions but encouraged criticism of the strong feminist movements of his time whom he criticized as having a lack of compassion on this matter. He believed all should be done to create a world in which women are supported socially, economically, culturally and politically to keep their children, to reduce the need for abortions.
