= Mahmud Panahiyan =

- Mahmud Pənahiyan
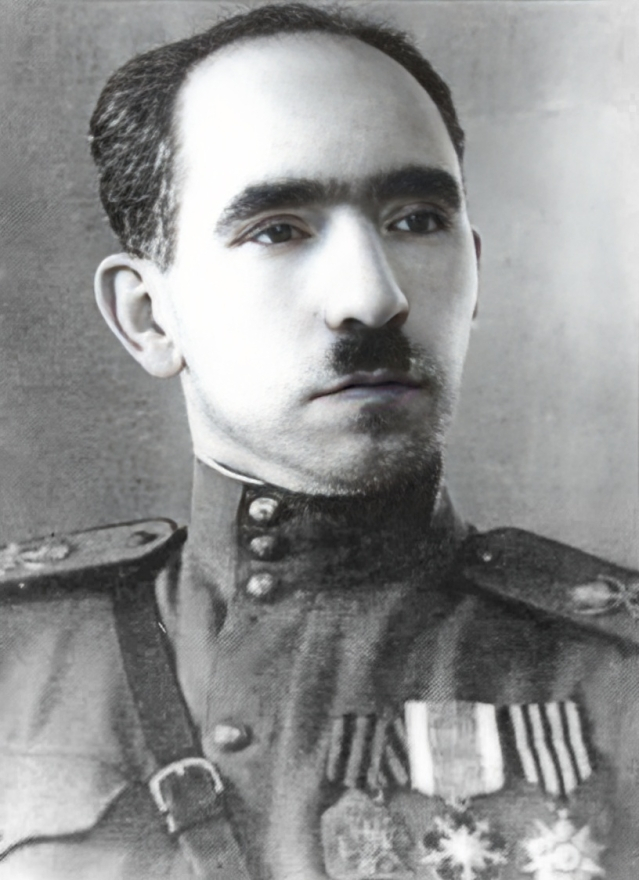
- Chief of Staff of the National Government and National Army of Azerbaijan
- In office 12 december1945 – 12 december 1946

Mahmud Panahiyan, also known as Mahmud Panahiyan Tabrizi (1908 in Tabriz – 1981), was a major general, scholar, member of the Azerbaijan Democratic Party, Chief of Staff of the Army, Chairman of the Military Court, and Director of the Tabriz Military School during the Azerbaijan People's Government period.

In 1970, he was invited by the Iraqi government to Baghdad, where he established the "Baghdad Radio" and the "National Front of the Peoples of Iran" group to oppose the Pahlavi regime. He authored several monographs on the history and geography of Iran and earned a doctorate in history and geography.

He was a descendant of the Javanshir dynasty, being a great-grandson of Ibrahim Khalil Khan, the Khan of Karabakh, and a descendant of Abulfat Khan.

== Life ==
Mahmud Ghulamhuseyn Khan oghlu Panahiyan was born in 1908 in the city of Tabriz. He received his primary education from a local religious teacher and later graduated from the Higher Military Academy in Tehran. He served in the Shah's army in various regions. In 1943, he joined the Tudeh Party along with his brother Ali. In September 1945, he left the Shah's army, returned to Tabriz, and joined the Azerbaijan Democratic Party. There, he participated in organizing resistance groups in the Khoy, Maku, and Salmas regions.

After the establishment of the Azerbaijan National Government, Jafar Kavian was appointed Minister of People's Army by Ja'far Pishevari. Within a short period, 300 officers of various ranks were gathered within the newly organized people's army. Of these, 14 officers were promoted to colonel and 9 to general. The total strength of the army was increased to 18,000 personnel. Several military schools were established.

Mahmud Panahiyan, awarded the rank of general by the decision of the Azerbaijan People's Government, was appointed Chief of Staff of the National Army. Additionally, he served as the head of the Tabriz Military School and the Military Court.

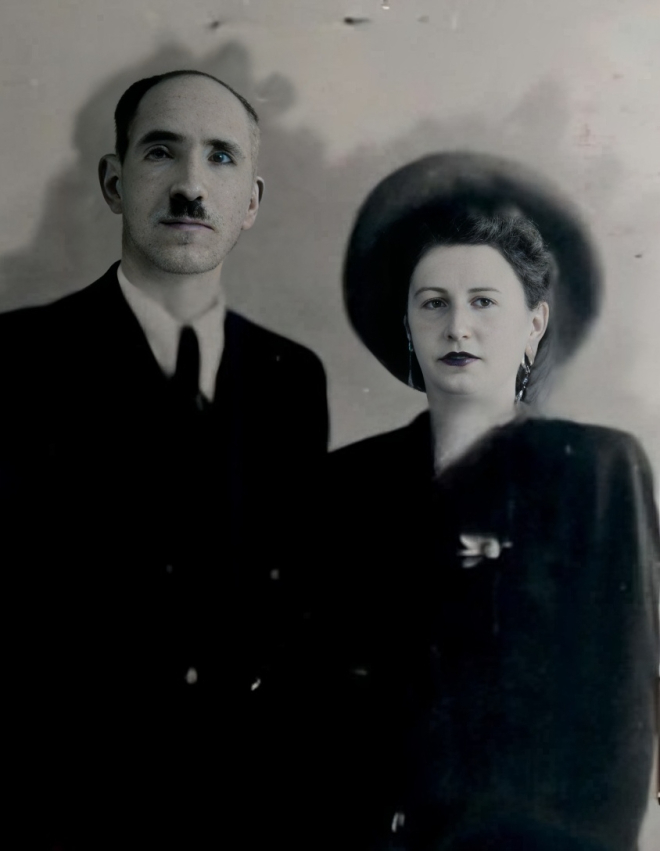
Mahmud Panahiyan and his wife

On December 20, 1945, the National Assembly of the Azerbaijan People's Government passed a law on the creation of the "Qizilbash" People's Army. The National Government gave its newly formed army the name "Qizilbash," the same name Shah Ismail Khatai had given his own army. The General Staff of the "Qizilbash" People's Army was established. The members of this staff included Jafar Kavian, Abdulqasim Azimi, Ghulam Yahya, Jafar Pishevari, Mirza Rabbi Kabiri, Mahmud Panahiyan, Navai, Mohsen Milanian, and Abdulreza Azar. In 1946, for his participation in the national-democratic movement and his bravery in the establishment of the National Government, he was awarded the "21 Azar" medal.

On August 1, 1946, a delegation led by Salamullah Javid and consisting of Haji Mirza Ali Shabustari, Sadiq Padegan, General Mahmud Panahiyan, Colonel Murtezavi, and Major Toghrai traveled to Tehran for negotiations.

On December 5, 1946, Shah's forces advancing toward Mianeh were stopped by the fedaeen. People from various regions of Azerbaijan approached the National Government, seeking to arm themselves and fight against the Shah's forces. Subsequently, a Defense Committee was established under the leadership of Pishevari.

Members of this committee included Haji Mirza Ali Shabustari, Qazi Muhammad, Ghulam Yahya, Mahmud Panahiyan, and Sadiq Padegan. The committee's first action was to declare martial law in Tabriz and organize volunteer groups.In the initial phase, 600 people joined the volunteer groups. Following this, Pishevari once again sought military support from the Soviet Union. However, his request went unanswered.

On December 13, 1946, the Iranian army, supported by the United States and the United Kingdom, entered Tabriz. This marked the collapse of the Azerbaijan People's Government. After the government fell, Mahmud Panahiyan moved to Baku. Following an order from Mir Jafar Baghirov, he and other party leaders were initially settled in Mardakan. Until 1970, he worked in various scientific fields in Baku. In 1970, he was invited to Baghdad by the Iraqi government. There, he collaborated with opponents of the Pahlavi regime and published the journal Ittihad, which was printed in Azerbaijani, Kurdish, Baluchi, and Persian. He also established the "Baghdad Radio" and the group "National Front of the Peoples of Iran." On August 12, 1970, Mahmud Panahiyan was invited to a hunting gathering where General Teymur Bakhtiar was killed by a SAVAK agent. He survived by not attending the event. Following the signing of the 1975 Algiers Agreement, he returned to Baku.

He authored several monographs on the history and geography of Iran. Between 1949 and 1953, based on data collected by the Geography Department of the Iranian Army General Staff, he published a four-volume "National Geographical Dictionary of Iranian Turks." The first two volumes were published in August 1972, and the remaining two in February 1973. This work provided information on the regions inhabited by Turks, statistics on their population, and their history. He earned a doctorate in history and geography.

He died in 1981.

== Family ==
He was a descendant of the Javanshir dynasty, being a great-grandson of Ibrahim Khalil Khan, the Khan of Karabakh, and a descendant of Abulfat Khan.
