= Mir Mehdi Etimad =

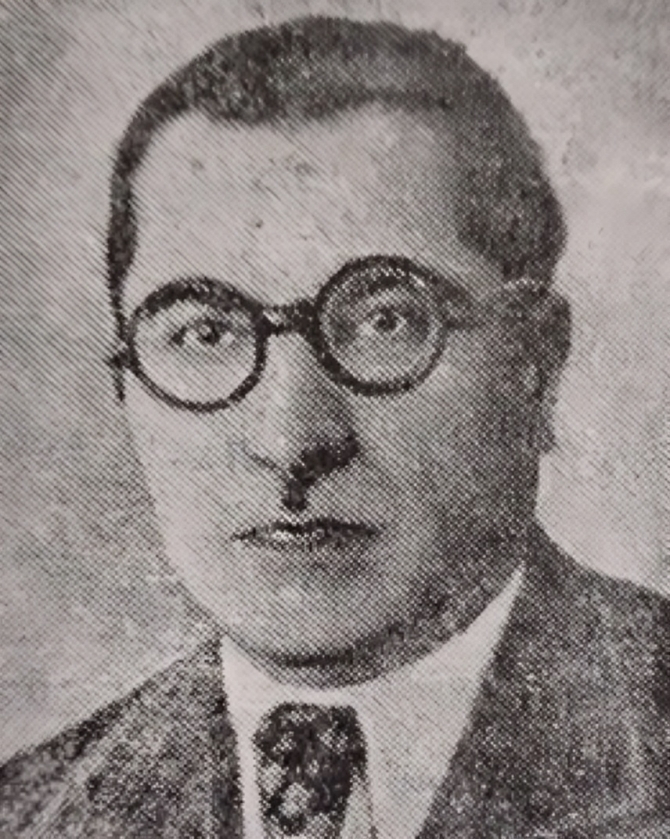
- Mir Mehdi Etimad
- Born: 1900; Tabriz, Qajar Iran
- Died: 1981 (aged 80–81); Tehran, Iran

Mir Mehdi Etimad (1900, Tabriz – 1981, Tehran) ― Azerbaijani poet, writer, participant in the 21 Azar movement, author of the lyricist for the Azerbaijan People's Government's anthem, "Yaşa, yaşa Azərbaycan!".

He was the chairman of the "Assembly of Poets" established in Tabriz and a member of the board of the "Society of Azerbaijani Poets and Writers". He published poems and articles in newspapers and journals printed in Tabriz such as Vətən Yolunda, Azərbaycan, Sitareyi-Azərbaycan, Xavəri-no, Azad millət, Urmiyyə, Cövdət, Fədai, Demokrat, and Azərbaycan ulduzu.

After the National Government of Azerbaijan was overthrown, he was arrested. After being released, he was not allowed to live in Azerbaijan and was exiled to Tehran.

== Life ==
=== Early years ===
Mir Mehdi Etimad was born in Tabriz in 1900.He first received a religious education at Molla Yusif’s school in Tabriz. After learning Arabic and Persian there, he continued his studies at Mirza Abullgasım Khan’s modern-style school. After graduating from there, he studied at the "Talibiyya" madrasa. Upon completing his education, he opened the modern-style "Etimad madrasa" in Tabriz, where he taught for 15 years. Burada 15 il dərs deyib. Alongside teaching, he was also engaged in creative writing.

During Reza Shah's reign, his book Ayineyi-Akhlag was reprinted 20 times, and his books Bədr-i-Qeyu-Əl-Səbyaiv and Mənazeyi-Ədəbi were reprinted 8–10 times. Later, he also wrote works titled "Alifbayi-Jadid", "Gul gonchasi", "Tohfalul-Sabyaiv", "Gəlinlər Bəzəyi", and "Çərşənbə Bazarı".

=== 21 Azar movement ===
He participated in the 21 Azar movement. During these years, he published poems and articles in newspapers and journals printed in Tabriz such as "Vətən Yolunda", "Azərbaycan" "Sitareyi-Azərbaycan", "Xavəri-no", "Azad millət", "Urmiyyə", "Cövdət", "Fədai", "Demokrat", and "Azərbaycan ulduzu".

In 1941, he became a member of the Azerbaijan Society established in Tabriz. Since the activities of the society concerned the central government, in 1942 the publication and reading of the society’s newspaper "Azərbaycan" was banned in Tehran. In 1942, the governor of the Third Province, Khalil Fahimi, issued a special declaration titled “Address to the People” against the society. In April 1942, representatives of the Iranian government banned the activities of the society and the "Azərbaycan" newspaper. A week later, active members of the society—Ismayil Shams, Haji Ali Shabustari, Mir Mehdi Etimad, and Mohammad Biriya—were forcibly taken to Baku by Soviet troops. After being held in Baku for some time, he was able to return to Tabriz in 1943. In 1945, the “Assembly of Poets” was established in Tabriz. Its first meeting was held on January 7, 1945, and Mir Mehdi Etimad was elected chairman of the assembly. In 1945, he joined the Azerbaijan Democratic Party. On November 20, 1945, the Azerbaijan People's Congress began its work at the Ark Theatre in Tabriz. Mir Mehdi Etimad also participated in the Azerbaijan People's Congress as a delegate. He was the chairman of the 12th district of the Azerbaijan Democratic Party in Tabriz. On December 12, 1945, the National Government of Azerbaijan was established. Mir Mehdi Etimad wrote the lyrics of the anthem of the National Government of Azerbaijan. The music for the anthem was composed by Cahangir Cahangirov. In 1946, he became a member of the board of the “Society of Azerbaijani Poets and Writers,” which was established on the basis of the “Assembly of Poets.”

On December 5, 1946, the Shah's troops advancing in the direction of Miyaneh were halted by the fedai forces led by Ghulam Yahya. People from various regions of Azerbaijan appealed to the National Government to arm themselves and resist the Shah's army. Following this, under the leadership of Mir Jafar Pishevari, a Defense Committee was established. The first action of the committee was to declare martial law in Tabriz and to form volunteer units called "Babak." In the initial phase, these volunteer units had 600 members. After this, Pishevari again appealed to the Soviet Union for military support. However, this request went unanswered.

On December 11, 1946, the Azerbaijan Provincial Council, in order to prevent bloodshed, issued a decision for the Qizilbash People's Army and fedai forces not to resist the Shah's troops and to leave the battlefields. From that day on, before the Iranian army entered major cities, landlord-led bandit groups and plainclothes gendarmes began massacres in those cities. These groups were referred to as “Iranian patriots” by Tehran radio. The main goal of these groups was to eliminate the Democrats and facilitate the entry of the Shah's army into the cities. Tabriz and other cities in Azerbaijan were subjected to looting and massacres. The National Government of Azerbaijan collapsed. On December 14, 1946, the Iranian army, supported by the United States and Great Britain, entered Tabriz. The massacres and looting continued afterward. Thousands of people were arrested and exiled. In the massacres, members of the Azerbaijan Democratic Party, fedai fighters, and well-known poets such as Ali Fitrat, Sadi Yuzbendi, Jafar Kashif, and Mohammadbaghir Niknam were killed.

=== After the fall of the National Government of Azerbaijan ===
After the fall of the National Government of Azerbaijan, Mir Mehdi Etimad was arrested in Tabriz. In 1948, he was released from prison following a general amnesty. However, he was not permitted to live in Azerbaijan, so he moved to the city of Tehran. During his time in Tehran, he became a founder and active member of many literary circles. He participated in poetry gatherings organized by Sahand, Farzaneh, and others.

He died in Tehran in 1981 at the age of 81.
