= Mohammad Biriya =

Iranian Azerbaijani poet and politician

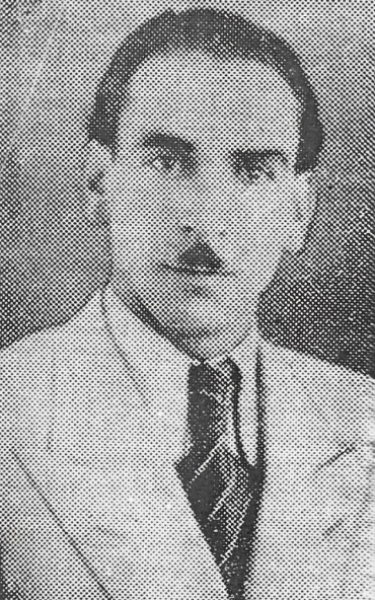

Culture Minister of Azerbaijan's Government
- In office 1945–1946

Personal details
- Born: 1914 Tabriz, Iran
- Died: 1985 (aged 70–71) Tabriz, Iran
- Party: Azerbaijani Democratic Party

Mohammad Biriya (Azerbaijani: Məhəmməd Biriya; 1914–1985), born Mohammad Baghirzadeh, was a poet, politician, a member of the Azerbaijan Democratic Party, Minister of Culture and Education in the Azerbaijani National Government, chairman of the Azerbaijan Trade Union established in Tabriz, a member of the Azerbaijani National Assembly, and a member of the board of the Azerbaijani Society of Poets and Writers. He was also a victim of repression.

He contributed with his poems and articles to numerous newspapers and journals published in Tabriz. Between 1943 and 1946, he served as the chief editor of the newspapers Yumruq, Ədəbiyyat səhifəsi (Literature page), and Qalaba, published in Tabriz. He authored plays such as Çətirbazlar (The Umbrella Men), Ruznamə idarəsində (At the Newspaper Office), Stalingrad, Ərbab və əkinçi (The Landowner and the Farmer), Mussolini, and Hitler və Mussolini (Hitler and Mussolini).

During his tenure as the Minister of Culture and Education in the Azerbaijani National Government, he ensured that school lessons were conducted in Azerbaijani Turkish, developed a new curriculum, and contributed to the writing of textbooks. For his participation in the national-democratic movement, he was awarded the "21 Azer" medal and the "Sattar Khan" order.

After the dissolution of the Azerbaijani National Government, he emigrated to Azerbaijan, where he faced persecution and was repeatedly imprisoned and exiled due to his activities. In total, he spent 22 years in exile and imprisonment under the Soviet regime. After returning to Tabriz, he was again imprisoned there and spent the final years of his life in detention.

== Life ==
=== Early years ===
Mohammad Haji Ghulam oghlu Bagirzadeh was born in 1914 in the city of Tabriz. His father was a carpenter. In 1920, his family moved from Tabriz to Baku and a year later to Khorasan. He received his early education in Khorasan. After his mother fell ill, doctors advised that Khorasan’s climate was harmful to her health. Consequently, in 1923, the family moved back to Baku. In 1929, he graduated from the seven-year school No. 37 in Baku and enrolled in the Oil Machinery Technical School. After the deaths of his mother and uncle, the family returned to Tabriz in January 1933. After returning to Tabriz, he briefly worked as a proofreader at the Shahin newspaper editorial office. From 1934 to 1938, he worked at the Municipality Administration in Tabriz.

In 1938, he began his military service in the 3rd Division of the 27th Regiment stationed in Tabriz. After completing his military service, he first worked as a clerk in the water department of Tabriz city administration and, from 1941, as an accountant at the railway administration.

=== Political activity ===
On August 25, 1941, the Soviet army entered Southern Azerbaijan. Starting from October 11, 1941, the newspaper Vətən yolunda began publication in Tabriz. Mohammad Biriya's poems and articles were published in this newspaper. He also contributed writings and poems to the newspapers Rəhbər, Zəfər, Mərdom, Dəvənd, Xavəre No, and Azərbaycan.

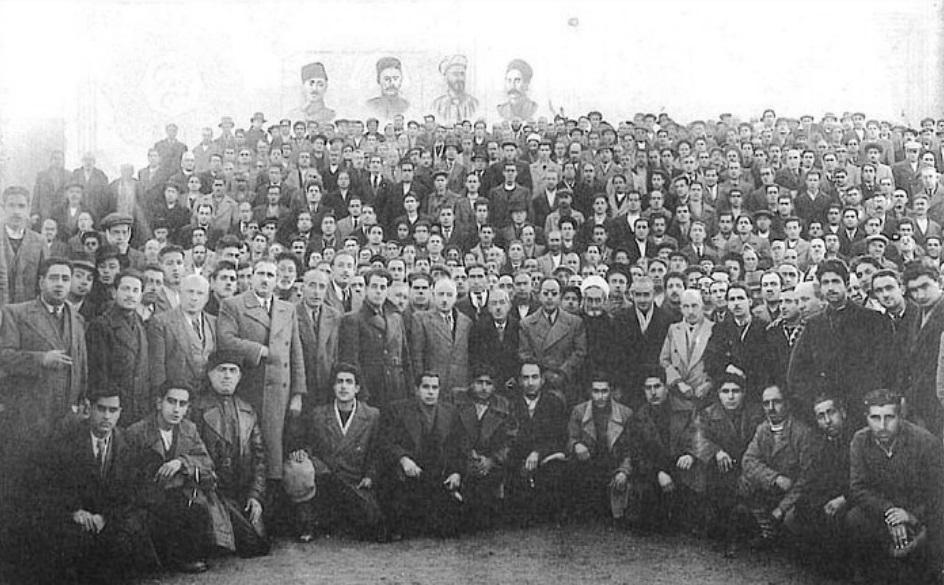
Representatives of the Azerbaijan People's Congress, Tabriz, November 20–21, 1945

In 1941, he was invited to Baku for 15 days along with a group of Southern Azerbaijani intellectuals. During this visit, his poems were published in the newspaper Kommunist.After returning to Tabriz, he intensified his activities with figures such as Haji Mirza Ali Shabustari, Ismayil Shams, Mir Mehdi Etimad, and others under the leadership of the Azerbaijani Society. He wrote poems and articles criticizing capitalism, imperialism, and colonialism. Due to persecution, Mohammad Biriya, along with Mirza Ali Shabustari, Ismayil Shams, and Mir Mehdi Etimad, was brought from Tabriz to Baku in 1942 by the Deputy Commissar of Internal Affairs of the Azerbaijan SSR, General Aghasalim Atakishiyev. He lived there until January 1943, during which time he worked with the Azerbaijan Writers’ Union and the Azerbaijan Radio Committee. After returning to Tabriz, he started publishing the newspaper Ədəbiyyat səhifəsi, which operated until 1945. In 1944, his poetry collection Ürək sözü (The Heart's Word) was published in Baku with a print run of 5,000 copies.

In 1943, Mohammad Biriya was elected chairman of the Azerbaijan Trade Union established in Tabriz. During his tenure, he facilitated the signing of a 41-article agreement between workers and employers. In mid-1944, he became one of the 17 members elected to the Tabriz City Committee of the restructured Tudeh Party. He was also a key organizer of numerous protests against royal oppression and colonial powers. During one of the demonstrations involving oil workers, an assassination attempt was made on him. The bullet intended for him killed a participant named Ismayil and injured three others. In 1945, he participated as a delegate at the World Trade Union Congress held in Paris.

On November 20, 1945, he was elected chairman of the Presidium of the Azerbaijan People's Congress, which convened at the Ark Theater in Tabriz.

On December 12, 1945, after the establishment of the Azerbaijani National Government, Mohammad Biriya was appointed Minister of Culture and Education.Additionally, he became a member of the newly formed National Assembly and the board of the Azerbaijani Society of Poets and Writers. During his one-year tenure as Minister of Culture and Education, he ensured that school lessons were conducted in Azerbaijani Turkish, developed a new curriculum, and oversaw the preparation of textbooks. Since the majority of the population was illiterate, 3,800 literacy courses were opened in a short period across the region. Additionally, 2,000 primary and secondary schools were established in rural areas, and 500 in urban areas. To address the shortage of specialists in various fields, several vocational courses and technical schools were created. Alongside his ministerial duties, in 1946, Biriya taught literature at the newly established "Azerbaijan University." The Azerbaijani Society of Poets and Writers was founded with centers in Tabriz, Zanjan, Urmia, Ahar, Ardabil, and other cities. The State Drama Theater and the State Philharmonic were opened, and the Behzad National Museum began its activities. Statues of Sattar Khan, Bagir Khan, and Sheikh Mohammad Khiabani were erected in Tabriz.

In 1946, for his contributions to the national-democratic movement, he was awarded the "21 Azar" medal and the "Sattar Khan" order.

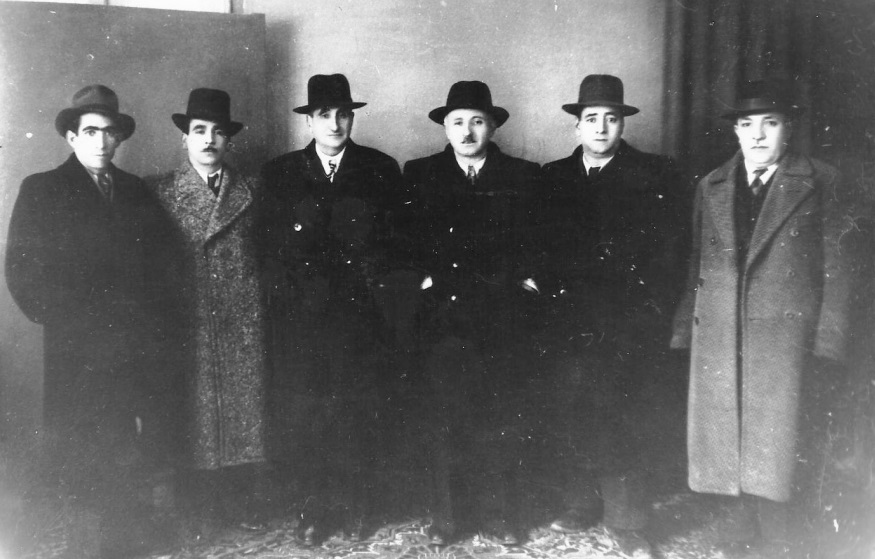
Salamulla Javid, Sadiq Padiqan, Mirjafar Peshavari, Haji Mirza Ali Shabustari, Muhammad Biriya, Taghi Shahin

After the Soviet Union withdrew from the region following promises made by the Iranian government, the Tehran government deployed troops to Southern Azerbaijan under the pretext of "ensuring free elections for the Councils Assembly." This led to disagreements among the leaders of the Azerbaijan Democratic Party about whether to resist the forces or not. While some suggested retreating to the Azerbaijan SSR to continue the struggle from there, Mohammad Biriya advocated for staying in the region and fighting against the invading army. During the last meeting of the Azerbaijan Democratic Party held in Tabriz, Mohammad Biriya was elected as the First Secretary of the party. He prepared a statement on the party's tactics and maintaining order in the region, which he read on the radio. On December 13, 1946, the Iranian army, supported by the United States and Great Britain, entered Tabriz. Thus, the Azerbaijani National Government collapses. Although Biriya and his comrades resisted the Iranian troops entering the city, they were outnumbered and forced to take refuge in the Soviet hospital in Tabriz. On March 8, 1947, with the help of employees of the Soviet consulate in Tabriz, Biriya was secretly transported to Baku.

=== After the collapse of the national government ===
In 1947, the Central Committee of the Azerbaijan Democratic Party was reestablished. Mohammad Biriya, elected to the committee, was appointed head of its propaganda department. Under the directive of the Central Committee of the Communist Party of Azerbaijan, he was admitted to the Republican Party School.

On December 27, 1947, Biriya applied to Behnam, the Iranian consul in Baku, with the intention of returning to Iran. After returning home, several prominent figures, including Mir Teymur Yakubov, Minister of Internal Affairs of the Azerbaijan SSR; Aghasalim Atakishiyev, Deputy Minister of State Security; Colonel Mohammad Savechalinski; Hasan Hasanov, Secretary of the Central Committee; and Mirza Ibrahimov, Deputy Prime Minister of the Azerbaijan SSR and a writer, visited his residence. They urged Biriya to withdraw his application to the Iranian consulate, but he refused. The next day, on December 28, 1947, Mohammad Biriya was arrested.

After an investigation lasting more than seven months, in August 1948, Mohammad Biriya was accused of harboring hostility towards the Soviet government and the democratic structure in Southern Azerbaijan, as well as of espionage activities with Americans in Tabriz and with Iran's consul general in Baku. On November 27, 1948, he was sentenced to 10 years in a labor camp, with the sentence calculated from August 11 of the same year. He served his sentence in Special Camp No. 4 of the Soviet Ministry of Internal Affairs. On December 31, 1950, he was sentenced to an additional 10 years of imprisonment by the camp court for conducting anti-Soviet propaganda among the prisoners. On August 23, 1951, during his time in the Lugovsk prison camp, he was sentenced to another year of imprisonment under strict supervision. From August 13, 1954, he served his sentence in Labor Camp No. 415 in Karaganda. On August 30, 1956, his case was reviewed, and the charges against him were dismissed on the grounds that no criminal elements were found in his actions.

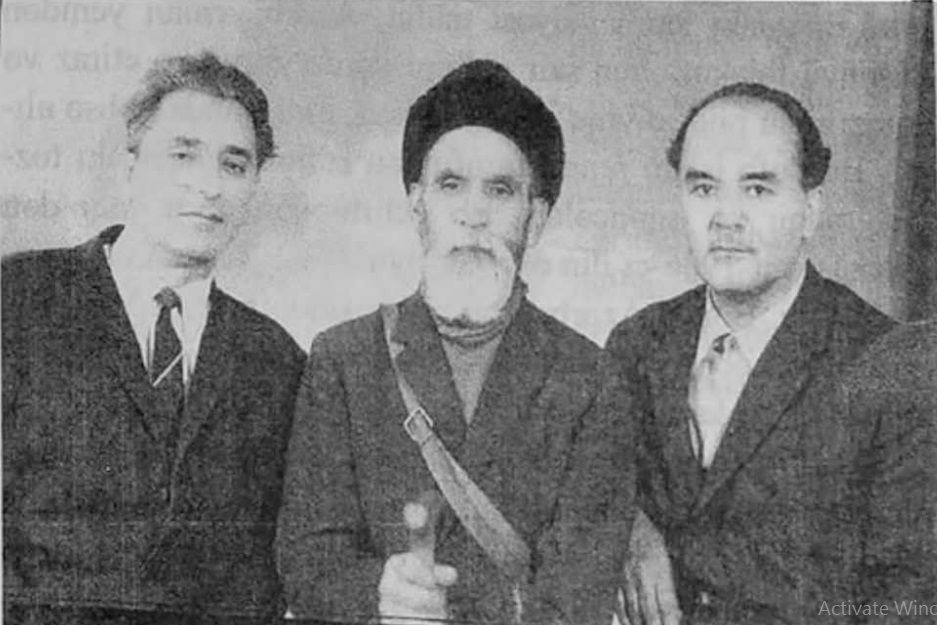
Mir Rahim Vilayi, Mohammad Biriya and Mirgasim Cheshmazer, September 12, 1969, Baku.

In 1956, Mohammad Biriya returned to Baku. Hoping to reunite with his family, he intended to travel to Tabriz. On November 12, 1956, he went to Moscow to obtain a visa but was prevented from entering the Iranian embassy and was sent back to Baku. On January 18, 1957, he sent a 16-point letter to the leaders of the Azerbaijani SSR government. In this letter, he demanded the abandonment of the Cyrillic alphabet in favor of the Arabic script, the closure of Marxist-Leninist schools, the removal of statues of Marx, Engels, Lenin, and Stalin, the expulsion of Armenians from Azerbaijan, the release of exiled individuals, and the establishment of Sharia law in the country. Following this letter, Biriya was accused of anti-government propaganda in 1957 and was again arrested. He was imprisoned in various cities over the next 10 years. After his release in 1967, he returned to Baku and once more sought to obtain a visa by traveling to Moscow. There, he was accused of insulting Soviet police and sentenced to two years of imprisonment in the Tambov region. Upon his release in 1969, Biriya returned to Baku, but security agencies did not permit him to reside there. As a result, he was exiled to Shamakhi for three years. After returning from Shamakhi, he worked as a cleric in cemeteries in Baku. In total, Mohammad Biriya spent 22 years in exile and imprisonment under the Soviet regime.

On September 29, 1980, Mohammad Biriya returned to Tabriz. There, he was accused of engaging in anti-government propaganda, subjected to persecution, and ultimately imprisoned. He passed away on February 19, 1985. Opinions regarding the circumstances of his death differ. Some researchers claim that he died while in prison, while others believe he was released shortly before his death and passed away in a home for the destitute.

Mohammad Biriya was buried in the Vadi-e Rahmat Cemetery in Tabriz. His self-written poem,"Vasiyyat" (Will) is inscribed on his gravestone.

== Creativity ==
Mohammad Biriya's literary journey began with the publication of his first poems in 1924 in the Divar magazine in Baku. In the 1930s, he started composing lyrical ghazals in Azerbaijani and Persian and adopted the pen name "Biriya," meaning "sincere" or "truthful." Starting from October 11, 1941, his poems and articles were published in the Vətən Yolunda newspaper in Tabriz. Additionally, he contributed works to other publications such as Rəhbər, Zəfər, Mərdom, Dəmavənd, Xavərə No, and Azərbaycan. Between 1941 and 1946, his poems opposing the Shah's regime and fascism, infused with patriotic fervor, circulated widely across Southern Azerbaijan. Notable works such as Bəlkə Qayıtdı Şahımız (Maybe Our Shah Returned), Ay Kişi Bayram Gəlir (Oh Man, the Holiday Is Coming), Binəva Kəndlinin Şikayəti (The Complaint of the Poor Peasant), Mən Öz Qanıma Qəltan Yaranmışam (I Am Wounded and Bathed in My Own Blood), and Hər Addımda Məzarı Var (Every Step Holds a Grave) were distributed as leaflets to the public. In 1941, along with a group of Southern Azerbaijani intellectuals, Biriya was invited to Baku for 15 days, where his poems were published in the Kommunist newspaper. In 1943, he initiated the publication of a literary newspaper titled Ədəbiyyat Səhifəsi in Tabriz, which operated until 1945. Subsequently, in 1945, he became the editor-in-chief of the Qələbə (Victory) newspaper, also published in Tabriz.

During his lifetime, Mohammad Biriya published several books. One of his notable works, Ürək Sözü (The Word of the Heart), was published in Baku with a print run of 5,000 copies. The 118-page book is divided into two parts: the first part contains 48 lyrical poems on various themes, while the second part features 57 satirical works. This book was also published on July 17, 1944, under the title Muxammed Biriya. Izbrannıe stixi (Mohammad Biriya. Selected Poems), with a foreword and editorial work by Mikayil Rafili.

His first book published in Tabriz was titled Vətənim Azərbaycana (To My Homeland Azerbaijan), featuring 34 poems, and was printed by the Xəlifə Gəri publishing house. In 1945, two more books, Üsyan (Rebellion) and Hücum (Attack), were published by the Firdovsi publishing house in Tabriz. Üsyan included 30 poems, while Hücum contained 18 poems.

Following the establishment of the Azerbaijan National Government, Biriya expanded his literary work to include plays. His short plays, such as Çətirbazlar (The Umbrella Sellers), Ruznamə İdarəsində (At the Newspaper Office), Stalinqrad, Ərbab və Əkinçi (The Landlord and the Farmer), Mussolini, and Hitler və Mussolini (Hitler and Mussolini), were performed on stage at the Ərk Theater in Tabriz and the Marağa City Theater.

== Memory ==
In 1947, a film titled Arazın O Tayında (Across the Araz), directed and scripted by Esfir Shub, was produced. The film focuses on the events leading up to the establishment of the Azerbaijan National Government in 1945–1946 and the processes that unfolded during its existence. In the film, Mohammad Biriya recites his own poem, Mən Deyirəm (I Say).

Moldovan writer Boris Marian, who was exiled in the same labor camp as Biriya, wrote about him in his book Bir Taleyin Dönərgələri (The Twists of a Fate).

In 1997, based on investigation materials preserved in the archives of the State Security Service, a book titled Hər Addımda Məzarım Var (At Every Step, There Is My Grave) was published. This book includes excerpts from the investigation files on Mohammad Biriya, as well as 20 lyrical poems and 29 satirical works selected from his 1944 book Ürək Sözü (The Word of the Heart), presented without any changes.

In 2004, a full-length documentary television film about Mohammad Biriya's life was produced. The film was directed and scripted by Anvar Abluc.
