= 1919 in Iran =

- Decades
- See also: Other events of 1919; Years in Iran

The following lists events that happened during 1919 in Qajar era.

== Incumbents ==
- Monarch: Ahmad Shah Qajar
- Prime Minister: Vosugh od-Dowleh

== Births ==
- January 31 – Morteza Motahhari, Iranian politician.
- February 6 – Nahid Mirza, iranian-Pakistani socialite.
- February 18 – Amir-Abbas Hoveyda, Iranian politician.
- February 20 – Lotfollah Safi Golpaygani, Iranian Ayatollah.
- March 12 – Samad Samadianpour, top police official.
- March 15 – Gholamhossein Bigdeli, Iranian Azerbaijani literary scholar.
- April 1 – Asadollah Alam, Prime Minister of Iran.
- August 13 – Abbas Zaryab, Iranian writer and translator.
- October 26 – Ashraf Pahlavi, Iranian royal.
- October 26 – Mohammad Reza Pahlavi, Shah of Iran from 1941 to 1979.
- November 3 – Abdorrahim Jafari, Iranian publisher.
- November 7 – Ali Tajvidi, Iranian musician.
- November 21 – Fereydun Ebrahimi, Prosecutor General of the National Government of Azerbaijan, victim of repression..
- December 13 – Mehrangiz Dowlatshahi, Iranian politician, writer and diplomat.
- ? – Abdul Karim Haghshenas.
- ? – Amir-Hossein Khozeimé Alam, Last ruling Amir of Qaenat and Sistan.
- ? – Amīr Aṣlān Afshār, Persian diplomat.
- ? – Asghar Parsa, Iranian politician.
- ? – Fereidoon Tavallali, Iranian poet.
- ? – Kazem Ordoobadi, Iranian painter.
- ? – Marousia Vahramian, Armenian artist, musician.
- ? – Nezhat Nafisi, Iranian politician.
- ? – Rasoul Parvizi, Iranian writer.
- ? – Rudolf Macúch, Slovak Protestant theologian and expert on Mandaean language and Samaritan language.

== Deaths ==
- ? – Hossein Ardabili, Iranian politician.
- ? – Mohammad-Ebrahim Khan Ghaffari, Iranian politician.
- ? – Mohammed Kazem Yazdi, Iraqi Shia Islamic scholar.
