= Abbasali Panbehi =

Azerbaijani politician

Abbasali Panbehi عباسعلی پنبه ای
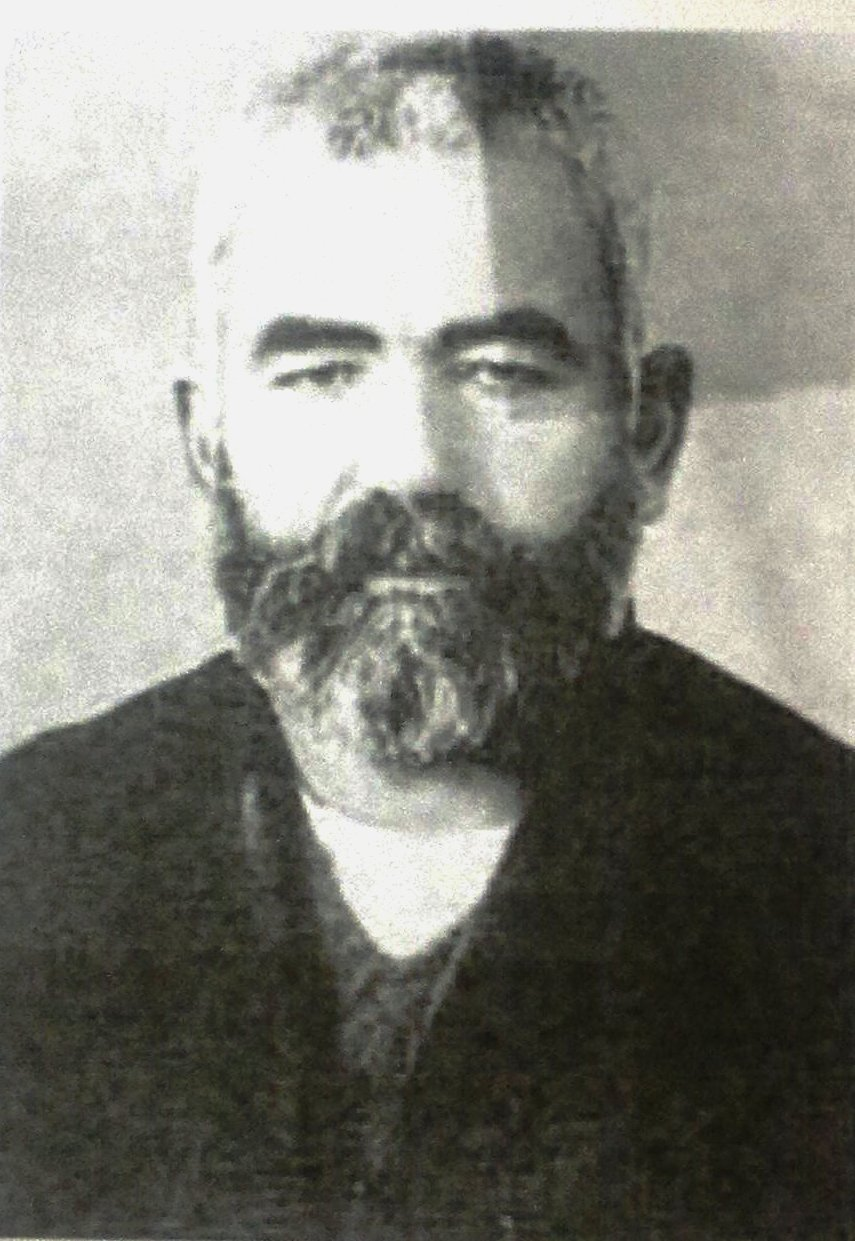

Representative of Mianeh in Azerbaijan National Congress
- Incumbent
- Assumed office 1945
- Monarch: Mohammad Reza Pahlavi

Mayor of Tabriz

The governor of Urumiya and the governor of Salmas

Personal details
- Born: 1897 November 22 Mianeh،
- Died: 1977 March 9 (aged 79) Tehran
- Party: Azerbaijani Democratic Party
- Other political affiliations: Tudeh Party of Iran
- Spouse: Sakina
- Children: Eshgiyeh, Fakhriyeh, Aaliyah, Meh Laqa, Ali
- Occupation: Businessman and politician
- Nickname: "Khal Oghli" (cousin)

Abbasali Panbehi (Persian: عباسعلی پنبه‌ای; November 22, 1897 – March 9, 1977) was a prominent Iranian acitivist and politician during the Pahlavi era, as well as a respected community leader in the Mianeh region in East Azerbaijan. He played a crucial role during the Democratic Party of Azerbaijan movement, serving as the representative of the party in Mianeh and later becoming the head of the city police in Tabriz. Subsequently, he held positions as the governor of Urmia and Salmas.

== Biography ==
=== Personal Traits ===
Abbasali Panbehi, the son of Bakhashali and Zobideh, was known for his devout and religious nature from a young age. His commitment to religious principles is evident in the writings of Mirza Abdulhossein Zooriastin Shirazi, the leader of the Ni'matullāhī Sufi order, confirming Panbehi's adherence to religious guidelines outlined in the book "Mones al-Salekin."

Panbehi gained fame for his involvement in resolving community issues and mediating conflicts, earning him the affectionate title of Khal Oghli, Persian for "cousin", among the people.

During his bachelorhood, Panbehi opposed the wishes of an influential representative of land owners of Mianeh in public gatherings, advocating for the establishment of a school in the town. His protest led to a verbal dispute, and Panbehi was summoned to court in Tabriz. When asked about the number of his children, he replied that he did not know, prompting ridicule from officials. In response, he declared that he had not married, thinking they were inquiring about the children of Mianeh. The court subsequently ruled in favor of establishing a school in Mianeh.

=== Post-Constitutional Revolution ===
Panbehi remained an active member of the Socialists' Party, particularly in connection with Mirza Ali Asghar Khan Sartipzadeh. He maintained correspondence with Sartipzadeh until the latter's death.

As a close friend of Mirzadeh Eshghi, Panbehi honored a dying wish to name his firstborn "Eshghi" if a boy and "Eshghiyeh" if a girl.

=== Reign of Reza Shah ===
After Reza Shah ascended to power in 1925 and suppressed freedom movements such as the Jangal movement, Panbehi and all political parties, including the Socialists, were dissolved. Panbehi was arrested, sent to Tabriz for trial, and later imprisoned and exiled to Sanandaj. During his exile, he befriended Sheikh Zanbil and Qazi Muhammad.

After two years of imprisonment and renewed exile, Panbehi returned to Mianeh and pursued a career in making traditional charoq (a type of footwear). During his work-related travels to Tehran, he encountered the Dervishes of Ni'matullāhī, joining their ranks. Every Friday night, Panbehi held a spiritual gathering at his home, known for its atmosphere of worship and prayer that lasted until dawn.

=== Post-Occupation Era and the Formation of the Democratic Party of Azerbaijan ===
Following the occupation of Iran by the Allies during World War II on August 25, 1941, and the political vacuum created after Reza Shah's resignation on September 16, 1941, various political parties expanded their activities. In this period, the Tudeh Party and the Workers' Syndicate gained momentum in Azerbaijan, supported by the Soviet Union. Panbehi rose to a prominent position within the Tudeh Party in Mianeh.

During this time, Ahmad Esfahani was nominated by the Central Committee of the Tudeh Party as a candidate to represent Mianeh in the National Consultative Assembly. Panbehi strongly opposed this nomination, leading to Esfahani's departure from Mianeh. Despite his high position in the Tudeh Party, Panbehi supported Mohammad Vali Mirza Farman Farmaian against multiple disagreements, and Farmanfarmaian was elected as the representative for the fourteenth term (1944 February 26 – 1946 March 12 ) to the National Consultative Assembly.

Before the closure of the Tudeh Party offices in Mianeh, a committee was formed, and Hassan Youssefi, the representative of Hamedan in the National Consultative Assembly and a notable figure in Mianeh, was appointed as the head of the Tudeh Party in Mianeh. Panbehi immediately traveled to Tabriz. In a single night, all Tudeh Party offices were closed, and the Democratic Party of Azerbaijan was established amidst uncertainty and doubt about the sincerity of the Russians. Following this, Tudeh Party members in Azerbaijan joined the Democratic Party of Azerbaijan.

Despite Panbehi's high rank in both the Tudeh Party and the Democratic Party of Azerbaijan, he repeatedly declared: "Cursed be the crooked gears of the Russians, a dollar tribute to the uncles of the English, and we cannot trust them."

Dr. Nosratollah Jahanshahlou, the later deputy of Ja'far Pishevari, described a conversation with Panbehi during this period, where Panbehi, being simple-minded, discussed the views of the Soviet government and threatened consequences if the Tudeh Party did not immediately join the Democratic Party.

In the subsequent years, Panbehi, along with Ghulam Yahya Daneshian, led the Fadaiyan semi-military group during the fall of Mianeh on November 17, 1945. Mianeh was the first city to fall to the Fadaiyan forces, cutting off communication between Azerbaijan and Tehran. The ease with which the Democratic Party took control of Mianeh was due to the lack of military personnel in the city and the role of Russian guards led by Captain Norozov. Despite minimal resistance from government forces, some, like the railroad patrolman Rostam Rahnama, were killed, attributed to the excessive violence of some Caucasian immigrant workers.

Abbasali Panbehi was appointed to the Azerbaijani National Assembly during the Fourth Congress of the People on November 25, 1945, under the leadership of Hajji Mirza Ali Shabestari.

=== Abbasali Panbehi's Role in Mediation and Administration ===
To prevent conflict between the Iranian army and the Fadaiyan of the Democratic Party of Azerbaijan, supported by the Soviet army, Panbehi played a crucial role. It was evident that in any military confrontation between these two forces, the Fadaiyan would be the absolute victors. Therefore, following the Soviet authorities' prevention of Tehran's forces from entering Azerbaijan and blocking their path in Qazvin, Panbehi, representing Seyed Jafar Pishevari, met with Colonel Ali Akbar Derakhshani, the commander of the Third Army of Eastern Azerbaijan, on December 13, 1945. Subsequently, the Azerbaijan Army surrendered to the Democratic Party of Azerbaijan on the same night. After the surrender, any officer could either remain in Azerbaijan or return to Tehran at their discretion, and most officers, including Colonel Derakhshani, chose to return to Tehran with their families either by land or air.

After the surrender of all military forces in Tabriz, Panbehi was appointed as the head of the city's security. In a short period, he succeeded in establishing unprecedented order and justice in Tabriz. During this time, Panbehi took actions, including suppressing and even executing criminals and deviant Fadaiyan, which had a significant impact on the people of Tabriz and scholars of the city, including Ayatollah Mirza Abdullah Mojtahedi.

In 1945, the Reza'iye Brigade, after resisting Soviet military threats, ultimately surrendered to the Democratic Party. Colonel Ahmad Zangeneh, the commander of the Reza'iye Brigade, and Colonel Ali Akbar Noorbakhsh, the commander of the Reza'iye Gendarmerie, were sent to Tabriz for trial. At this time, Panbehi met with these two prisoners and promised to work for their release. The matter of exchanging these two individuals with the Tehran prisoners, who were captured during the September 1941 urban clashes between landlords and villagers, was raised by Panbehi in the central committee of the Democratic Party. The proposal was approved, and the Tabriz court sentenced these two to ten years in prison after issuing a death sentence. After the exchange, Colonels Zangeneh and Noorbakhsh were later released by Mohammad Reza Pahlavi in Tehran on July 10, 1946.

Panbehi, to establish communication and unity between the Democratic Party of Azerbaijan and the Democratic Party of Kurdistan, was sent to Kurdistan due to his familiarity with Qazi Muhammad. During the complete dominance of the Democratic Party in Azerbaijan, Gholi Ov, the Soviet consul in Tabriz, summoned Panbehi to the Soviet consulate. During the conversation, Panbehi, in a confrontational tone, told the consul, "You have made a mistake sending a consul of the Soviet government to Tabriz. You should go to Moscow's theaters for entertainment." and asked Yalsha to translate the sentences. Despite Yalsha's numerous requests to Panbehi (he always addressed Panbehi as "father") not to translate the sentences, he insisted, and the consul, upset and angry, left the room after the translation.

A few days after the verbal altercation with Gholi Ov, Panbehi was appointed as the governor of Reza'iye. This appointment was practically a form of exile for Panbehi.

In late 1947, Panbehi was once again demoted and appointed as the governor of the small city of Shapur. He remained there until the fall of the Democratic Party, when he and some family members were arrested in this city.

=== Re-arrest and Exile ===
After the appointment of Mohammad Birya as the Secretary-General of the Democratic Party, replacing Seyed Jafar Pishevari, Panbehi and Dr. Salamullah Javid announced their consent to the entry of central government forces into Azerbaijan through a resolution on December 12, 1946. Following this decision, a considerable number of Fadaiyan and members of the party, estimated by Baku newspapers to be around 70,000, withdrew to Soviet territory. From the morning of December 12, 1946, massacres and looting against the Democratic Party spread throughout Azerbaijan. Secretary-General Mohammad Birya did not last more than one night and immediately sought refuge in the Soviet Consulate after announcing the government forces' entry for election supervision. The National Congress of Azerbaijan was dissolved and transformed into the State Assembly of Azerbaijan.

Panbehi was arrested in Salmas, and after severe beatings, he was sent to Tabriz. His wife and young children were returned to Miāneh by military truck. The family's belongings in Miāneh were looted by thugs. After trial, Panbehi was initially sentenced to death but later commuted to life imprisonment. He spent one and a half years in Tabriz Prison and then another year and a half in Bandar Abbas Prison. Subsequently, he endured a challenging period of exile and was eventually released. In Tehran, he was taken to the army headquarters, where the amnesty order was communicated to him. He then resumed his previous occupation in Miāneh.

Panbehi's journey included imprisonment, exile, and hardship, marking the turbulent times during the fall of the Democratic Party in Azerbaijan.

=== Civil Activities After the Democratic Party Era ===
One of Panbehi's notable post-Democratic Party actions was the construction of an irrigation canal in Miandoab in the early 1950s. With the approval and support of the then-mayor of Miandoab, he invested heavily in the project, employing around forty people over four years. Panbehi, the innovator of the project, successfully completed it and made it available to the public. In those days, the canal provided water to the cotton fields of Panbehi, the public bathhouse, the bank's water storage, and the bazaar bathhouse. The canal, known as "Qareh Chay" or "Kahriz Panbehi," still exists and is utilized by the Miandoab municipality.

Another significant activity of Panbehi was his involvement in the establishment of the Red Crescent and Red Lion Society's clinic in Miandoab. Until the 1950s, Miandoab had been deprived of medical facilities. Panbehi was chosen as an honorary member of the board of trustees of the clinic and actively participated in the construction of the clinic building and its management. Additionally, he played a key role in the construction of new schools and in the affairs of the Miandoab City Council.

Panbehi's life came to an end on March 9, 1977, due to a car accident in Tehran. He was buried in Behesht-e Zahra cemetery in Tehran. The funeral ceremony was attended by figures such as Sohrab Sepehri, Dr. Salamullah Javid, and his close relatives.

=== Poetry ===
Despite lacking formal education, Panbehi was a self-taught individual with a keen interest in poetry and civil activities.

He had a deep appreciation for the works of classical Persian poets such as Hafez Shirazi, Rumi, Attar Neyshaburi, Mirzadeh Eshqi, and Safi Ali Shah fa. In his speeches and conversations, he often drew inspiration from their poetry.

Panbehi composed numerous poems in Azerbaijani Turkish, many of which were collected in a booklet. Unfortunately, over time, many of these poems have been lost.

Until the end of his life, Panbehi actively participated in literary gatherings at the invitation of the renowned poet Shahriar.
