= 1916 in Iran =

- Decades
- See also: Other events of 1916; Years in Iran

The following lists events that happened during 1916 in Qajar era.

== Incumbents ==
- Monarch: Ahmad Shah Qajar
- Prime Minister: Abdol-Hossein Farman Farma (until February 29), Mohammad Vali Khan Khalatbari Tonekaboni (March 5 – August 29), Vosugh od-Dowleh (starting August 29)

== Births ==
- May 11 – Farangis Yeganegi.
- June 24 – Roohangiz Saminejad, Iranian actress.
- August 5 – Sadeq Chubak, Iranian novelist.
- August 7 – Fathollah Minbashian, persian general.
- August 24 – Mohammad-Taqi Bahjat Foumani, Iranian Grand Ayatollah.
- September 23 – Anna Borkowska (actress), Iranian Polish actress.
- October 12 – Morteza Haeri Yazdi, Iranian Ayatollah.
- December 1 – Abdul Aziz Malazada, Iranian Sunni faqih.
- ? – Abbas Qarib, Iranian footballer.
- ? – Ashig Huseyn Javan, Iranian poet.
- ? – Jahangir Forouhar, Iranian actor.
- ? – Jamaluddin Mostaghimi, Iranian academic.
- ? – Khadijeh Saqafi, Iranian revolutionary and Ruhollah Khomeini's wife.
- ? – Rasoul Parvizi, Iranian writer.
- ? – Safi Asfia, Iranian politician.
- ? – Yosef Hamadani Cohen, Iranian rabbi.

== Deaths ==
- ? – Baqir Khan, Iranian revolutionary.
- ? – Mirza Hossein-Qoli, Iranian musician.
- ? – Moayed-ol Mamalek Fekri Ershad, Iranian artist, journalist and playwright.
- ? – Touran Agha Khanoum Qajar, Iranian poet; daughter of Naser al-Din Shah Qajar and Khazen al-Douleh.
