= 1897 in Iran =

- Decades
- See also: Other events of 1897; Years in Iran

The following lists events that happened during 1897 in Qajar era.

== Incumbents ==
- Monarch: Mozaffar ad-Din Shah Qajar

== Births ==
- January 23 – Ahmad Matin-Daftari, Prime Minister of Iran.
- March 31 – Ali Dashti, Iranian politician.
- May 17 – Gholamreza Rouhani, Iranian poet.
- ? – Abbasali Panbehi, Azerbaijani politician.
- ? – Abdolrahman Faramarzi, Iranian journalist.
- ? – Abdolsamad Kambakhsh, Iranian politician.
- ? – Alexander Kostellow, Qajar Iranian-born American industrial designer, teacher.
- ? – Ali-Akbar Shahnazi, Iranian musician.
- ? – Badiozzaman Forouzanfar, Iranian scholar of Persian literature and culture.
- ? – Hashem Akbarian, Iranian wrestler.
- ? – Hossein Navab, Iranian politician and diplomat.
- ? – Mohammad-Ali Angaji, politician.
- ? – Sa'id Hormozi, Iranian musician.
