= Mahammad Hatami Tantekin =

Azerbaijani politician

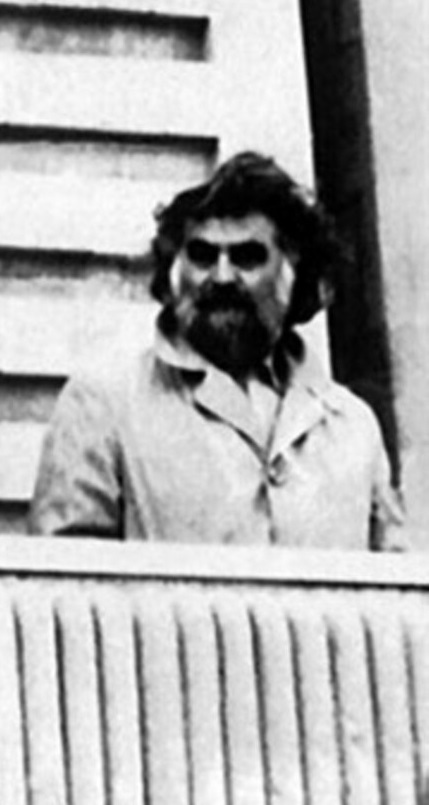
- Tantekin on 17 November 1988
- Born: 22 July 1935; Astara, Iran
- Died: 13 June 2016 (aged 80); Baku, Azerbaijan
- Occupation: Politician

Mahammad Hatami Tantekin was one of the leaders of the national liberation movement in Azerbaijan, the founder of the National Liberation Party and the Chanlibel organization. He participated in the battles of the First Karabakh War as part of the "National Salvation" battalion.

== Life ==
Mahammad Hatami was born on July 22, 1935, in the city of Astara.

On December 12, 1945, he became a member of the youth organization of the Democratic Party of Azerbaijan after the establishment of the National Government of Azerbaijan with its center in Tabriz. After the collapse of the National Government of Azerbaijan, he and his family were moved to the village of Garachala, then to Shamakhi, and then to Khudat. He graduated from school in Khudat in 1956. After graduating from school in 1957, he entered the philological faculty of Azerbaijan State University. In 1963, he graduated from the university, defending his thesis on Sheikh Mahammad Khiyabani.

He was a member of the Democratic Party of Azerbaijan and was published in its newspaper "Azerbaijan". At the same time, he, together with several comrades in the party, spoke against Gulam Yahya, who was the chairman of the Democratic Party of Azerbaijan, and demanded his resignation. After that, he was excluded from the party. In 1965, he began working at the National Academy of Sciences of Azerbaijan. In 1972, he defended his thesis on "The expression of fire worship in folk art" and received the title of candidate of philological sciences.

He became the founder of Chanlibel society, one of the first organizations that actively participated in the national liberation movement in Azerbaijan. On October 30, 1988, at the last meeting of the "Chanlibel" organization, it was announced that the People's Movement Front had been created and Mahammad Hatami was elected the chairman of the People's Movement Front. He was one of the organizers of national rallies that began on November 17, 1988, on Azadlig Square. On December 4, 1988, he was arrested after the Soviet troops dispersed the protesters on the square. He was released from prison on June 6, 1989. On November 8, 1989, he founded the National Liberation Party, uniting the People's Movement Front (Kizilbashlar) and Independent Azerbaijani Organizations.

After the "Black January" tragedy, he was arrested on January 26, 1990, and taken to Lefortovo prison, where he spent 9 months in prison.

He participated in the battles as part of the "National Salvation" battalion in the First Karabakh War. In 1993, he returned to his former place of work - at the National Academy of Sciences of Azerbaijan - and continued his scientific activity as a folklorist. He wrote the book "Bitter Truths" about the national liberation movement.

On June 10, 2016, he was hospitalized due to a sharp deterioration in health. He died on 14 June. He was buried at the cemetery in the village of Bulbula.

== Family ==
His father, Farzulla Khatami Khatamkhan oglu, was born in Uchbulag village of Ardabil district. When the National Government of Azerbaijan was established on December 12, 1945, he received the rank of senior lieutenant and was awarded the "21 Azar" medal. His mother, Sitara Khanum, was born in the village of Muganly in the Astara district in Iran.
