= Ashig Huseyn Javan =

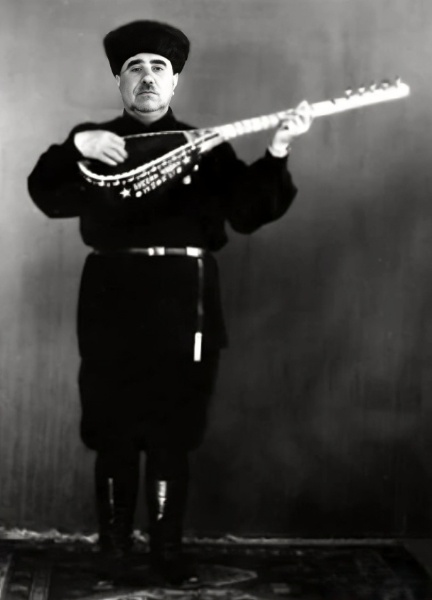
- Born: 1916; Uti village, East Azerbaijan province, İran
- Died: November 14, 1985 (aged 68–69); Azizbeyov, Goranboy
- Occupation: poet

Ashig Huseyn Javan or Huseyn Aliyev (1916, Uti village, East Azerbaijan Province – November 14, 1985), was a poet, ashig, and participant in the 21 Azar movement. Member of the Azerbaijan Democratic Party, the Azerbaijan Writers' Union, and Honored Cultural Worker of the Azerbaijan SSR (1967).

In 1946, for his participation in the national-democratic movement, he was awarded the "21 Azar" medal by the National Government of Azerbaijan, and for his work in the field of art, he was awarded the Order of the Badge of Honour by the USSR.

== Life ==
=== Early years ===
Huseyn Aliyev was born in 1916 in the village of Uti, Karadagh region. After his father's death, he moved to Northern Azerbaijan with his mother, Zohra. For a time, they lived in the village of Sharafkhanly in Aghjabadi, and later in the city of Delimammadli.

Beginning in 1927, he studied under Ashig Musa, the nephew of Ashig Alasgar. In 1938, he was exiled from the USSR and settled in Tabriz.

Although he began writing poetry in 1934, his main poetic activity started in 1941. He took the pen name "Javan." His first poems, such as "Smile, Azerbaijan," "Awaken, My Citizen," "Motherland," "October," and others, were published in the "Vatan yolunda" newspaper in Tabriz.

He participated in the 21 Azar movement. On 20 November 1945, the Azerbaijani People's Congress commenced its activities at the Ark Theater in Tabriz. Huseyn Javan also participated as a delegate in the Azerbaijani People's Congress. On December 21, 1945, the National Government of Azerbaijan was established. In March 1946, for his role in the national-democratic movement, he was awarded the “21 Azar” medal. In the same month, the Tabriz State Philharmonic was established in Tabriz. Ashig Huseyn Javan was appointed deputy director of the Philharmonic. Under his leadership, an ensemble of ashigs was formed within the Philharmonic.

On December 5, 1946, the Shah's forces attacking in the direction of Miyaneh were stopped by the fedais led by Ghulam Yahya. After that, people from various regions of Azerbaijan began appealing to the National Government to arm themselves and fight against the Shah's forces. As a result, under the leadership of Mir Jafar Pishevari, a Defense Committee was established. The committee's first action was to declare martial law in Tabriz and to form volunteer units called "Babak." In the first stage, these volunteer units had 600 members. After that, Pishevari once again appealed to the Soviet Union for military support. However, this request also remained unanswered.

On December 11, 1946, the Azerbaijani Provincial Assembly, in order to prevent bloodshed, decided that the Qizilbash People's Forces and the fedai forces should not resist the Shah's forces and should leave the battlefields. From that day on, before the Iranian army entered major cities, bandit groups of landlords and plainclothes gendarmes began massacres in these cities. These groups were called "Iranian patriots" by Tehran radio. The main goal of these groups was to destroy the democrats and ensure the entry of the Shah's forces into the cities. Tabriz and other cities of Azerbaijan were subjected to plunder and massacres. The National Government of Azerbaijan collapsed. On December 14, 1946, the Iranian army, supported by the United States and Great Britain, entered Tabriz. After that, the massacres and looting continued. Thousands of people were arrested and exiled. During these massacres, members of the ADF, fedais, as well as well-known poets such as Ali Fitrat, Sadi Yuzbendi, Jafar Kashif, and Mahammadbaqir Niknam were killed. The Shah's forces also searched for Huseyn Javan to kill him. When they could not find him, they looted his house and destroyed his manuscripts. His wife Hamida and his children were arrested by the Shah's agents and exiled to Khorramabad, a southern province of Iran. While in exile, two of his children died.

=== After the collapse of the National Government of Azerbaijan ===
After the collapse of the National Government of Azerbaijan, Ashig Huseyn Javan emigrated to Northern Azerbaijan. In 1946, he worked as a soloist at the Azerbaijan State Philharmonic named after Muslim Magomayev. After the collapse of the National Government, the "Society of Poets and Writers" which operated in Tabriz began to operate in Baku from 1947 under the name "Azerbaijan Writers' Society." Ashig Huseyn Javan was also a member of this society. In 1948, he became a member of the Azerbaijan Writers' Union. Since 1948, he moved to the village of Kahrizli in the Goranboy district.

In 1959, during the ten-day festival of Azerbaijani literature and art held in Moscow, he was the artistic director of the Ashigs ensemble. He was awarded the "Order of the Badge of Honor" by the USSR. In 1967, he received the honorary title of Honored Cultural Worker of the Azerbaijan SSR. At various times, his books were published in Baku: "Songs of Freedom" (1950), "Desires of the Ashig" (1950), "Poems" (1953), "Pearl Saz" (1956), "Goshmas" (1959), "Poems" (1962), "Speak, My Stringed Saz" (1966), "Folk Ashig" (1975), and "Like Spring" (1979).

=== Death ===
He died on November 14, 1985, and was buried in the village of Kahrizli.

== Memory ==
In 1947, the film "On the Other Side of the Araz", directed and scripted by Esfir Shub, was produced. The film is about the Azerbaijan National Government, which existed in 1945–1946, and the events that took place leading up to the establishment of the government. In this film, a performance by Ashig Huseyn Javan was also recorded.

On November 22, 2016, the 100th anniversary of Ashig Huseyn Javan was celebrated at the Rashid Behbudov Song Theater, organized by the Ministry of Culture and Tourism of the Republic of Azerbaijan and the Azerbaijan Ashigs Union.
