= Mostaghimi =

Mostaghimi is a surname. Notable people with the surname include:

- Jamaluddin Mostaghimi, Iranian physician
- Mohammad Mostaghimi (born 1951), Iranian poet
