= Fereydun Ebrahimi =

Iranian lawyer and politician

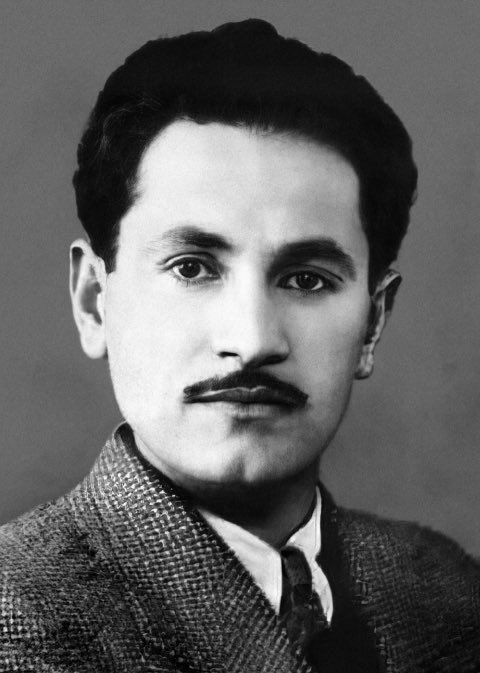

Procurator-General of Azerbaijan People's Government
- In office 1945–1946

Personal details
- Born: 1919 Astara, Iran
- Died: 1947 (aged 27–28) Tabriz, Iran
- Party: Azerbaijani Democratic Party
- Education: University of Tehran

Fereydun Ebrahimi (Azerbaijani: فریدون ابراهیمی, Persian: فريدون ابراهيمي; 1919 – 1947) was an Iranian Azerbaijani jurist and politician. He was chairman of the Azerbaijani Democratic Party in the Iranian province of Azerbaijan Astara, and a graduate of faculty of law of Tehran University. Ebrahimi was the Procurator-General of Azerbaijan People's Government in 1945. He was executed in Tabriz after the fall of Azerbaijan People's Government. He is considered to be the great-uncle of French author Marjane Satrapi.

== Life ==
=== Early life ===
Firidun Gani oglu Ibrahimi was born on November 21, 1918 in Astara. After studying in Astara until the 9th grade, he moved to Anzali to continue his education. After studying in Anzali for the 10th and 11th grades, he moved to Tabriz and studied in the 12th grade at the Firdovsi School. After graduating from school in 1941, he entered the Faculty of Law of Tehran University. He graduated from the Faculty of Law of Tehran University in 1945. During these years, he mastered Persian, French, and Arabic.

After studying in Astara until the 9th grade, he moved to Anzali to continue his education. After studying in Anzali for the 10th and 11th grades, he moved to Tabriz and studied in the 12th grade at the Firdovsi School. After graduating from school in 1941, he entered the Faculty of Law of Tehran University. He graduated from the Faculty of Law of Tehran University in 1945.

== Political activism ==
Ibrahimi became involved in the movement of making the region of Azerbaijan an independent country.

A member of the 21 Azer, Ibrahimi was made the Procurator-General of Azerbaijan in 1945 Ibrahimi together with Zeynalabdin Qiyami were tasked with writing a history of Azerbaijan.

In 1946, Ibrahimi was made the minister of Education and given the responsibility to establish a school system.

The following year the Shah's forces took control over the region and many members of the government fled. Ibrahimi however chose to remain.

Ibrahimi advised his brother Anushiravan Ibrahimi to flee with his family to the Soviet controlled region, which he did and settled in Baku. Ibrahimi himself was arrested.

== Death ==
Ibrahimi was executed on May 22, 1947, by hanging in the Golestan Park in Tabriz.

He was later buried in Emamiyyeh cemetery; [Persian:قبرستان امامیه]

Ibrahimi's father was poisoned to death after being released from prison in December 1958.

Returning to Iran after the Iranian revolution, and continuing to work towards an independent Azerbaijan, Ibrahimi's brother Anoushiravan Ibrahimi was arrested and executed in Evin Prison in Teheran on 13 September 1987.
