= Azizbekovo =

Azizbekovo may refer to:

- Əzizbəyov, Goranboy, Azerbaijan
- Basqal, Azerbaijan
