= Nosratollah Jahanshahlou =

Iranian politician (1913–2012)

Nosrat-ollah Jahanshahlou

First Deputy Prime Minister of Azerbaijan's Government
- In office 1945–1946

Personal details
- Born: 1913 Tehran, Sublime State of Persia
- Died: 2012 (aged 98–99) Berlin, Germany
- Party: Tudeh Party of Iran & Azerbaijani Democratic Party

Nosrat-ollah Jahanshahlou (1913–2012) was a leftist Iranian politician. He was among The Fifty-Three group who were arrested because of their political activities in November 1938 in Iran. After World War II he joined to the separatist movement of Azerbaijan People's Government in Tabriz. During this time he served as the first chancellor of University of Tabriz. After collapse of the Azerbaijani government by the Imperial Iranian Army, he fled to the USSR with couple of other members of Azerbaijani Democratic Party. After 26 years of residing in Soviet Azerbaijan he immigrated to East Germany, then to Switzerland.

== Personal life ==
He was born in Tehran to Zanjani father in May 1913. He graduated from University of Tehran with Doctor of Medicine degree. He died in Berlin, Germany at the age of 99.
