= Jafar Kavian =

Iranian politician

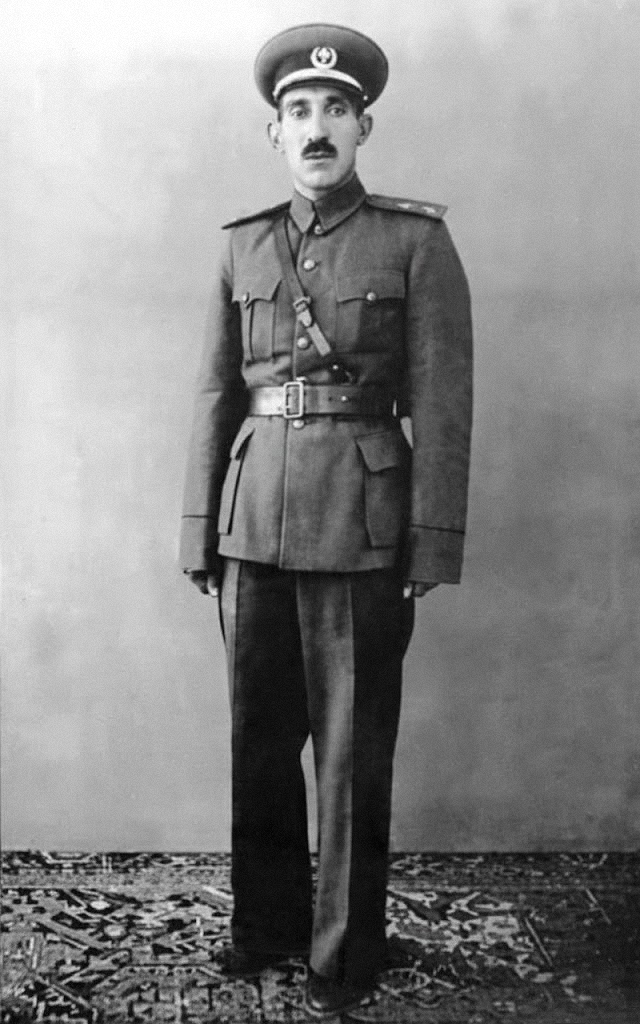
- Born: 1895; Sahlan, Qajar Iran
- Died: 1975 (aged 79–80); Baku, Azerbaijan
- Military career
- Allegiance: Azerbaijan People's Government
- Branch: Azerbaijan People's Government Army
- Service years: 1945–1946
- Rank: Major general
- Commands: Minister of War in Azerbaijan People's Government
- Awards: "21 Azer" Medal

Jafar Kavian or Jafar Mammadzadeh (1895, Tabriz – 1975, Baku) was a fedai, politician, major general, Minister of People's Army of the Azerbaijan People's Government established in Tabriz, and a member of the National Assembly of the Azerbaijan National Government. He was a member of the Iranian Communist Party, the Central Committee of the Tudeh Party, and the organizing committee of the Azerbaijan Democratic Party.

He participated in the Constitutional, Khiyabani, Lahuti, and 21 Azar movements, leading fedai units in the Khiyabani, Lahuti, and 21 Azar movements.

For his bravery in the establishment of the Azerbaijan People's Government, he was awarded the "21 Azar" medal and the "Sattar Khan" order.

== Family ==
Jafar Kavian's father, Mahammadali, was from the village of Sahlan near Tabriz. His mother, Zivar, was from the village of Gullu, located around Marand. Both his father and brother, Israfil, were participants in the Constitutional Revolution. After the movement was suppressed, his father was arrested and, after being tortured in prison, died. Sahlanlı Mahammadali is also depicted in the novel "Sattar Khan" by Panahi Makulu.

Jafar Kavian married Sakina. From this marriage, he had five children: Kave (born in 1927), Puran (born in 1930), Malahat (born in 1931), Marks (born in 1937), Maisa (born in 1942), and Israfil Kavian (born in 1947).

== Memory ==
In 1947, the film "Arazın o tayında," directed and written by Esfir Shub, was released. The film deals with the processes leading up to the establishment of the Azerbaijan National Government, which existed between 1945 and 1946. Jafar Kavian also appeared in the film.

In 1975, a necrology for Jafar Kavian was published in the newspaper "Azərbaycan," the press organ of the Azerbaijan Democratic Party. In 1969, Mahammad Biriya, the Minister of Culture and Education of the Azerbaijan National Government, dedicated a poem titled "Yadigar" to Jafar Kavian.

Jafar Kavian is also mentioned in the book "Son Döyüş" by Akram Salimzadeh and Rzabala Nureliyev about Islam Aliyev.

On May 16, 2014, Jafar Kavian's archive, including the Sattar Khan order, the 21 Azar medal, his sword, military uniform, and other personal belongings, was donated to the Azerbaijan Independence Museum by his son Marks Kavian. These exhibits are displayed in the museum's section dedicated to South Azerbaijan.

On April 3, 2015, the Azerbaijan Independence Museum held an event-exhibition titled "Illuminated Memory" in honor of Jafar Kavian's 120th anniversary.
