= Mirgasim Cheshmazer =

Azerbaijani politician (1920–2000)

- Mirqasım Çeşmazər
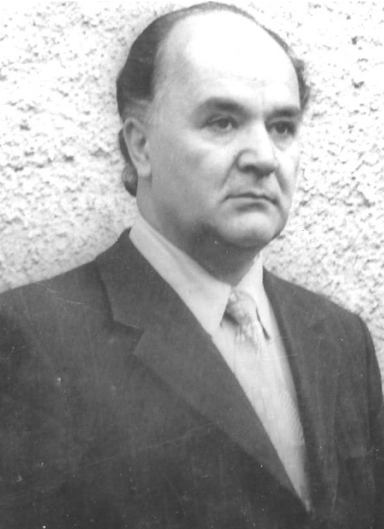
- Born: 1920
- Died: 2000 (aged 79–80)
- Political party: Azerbaijani Democratic Party
- Awards: order of "Sattarkhan"

Mirgasim Cheshmazer was Chairman of the Azerbaijan Democratic Party in 1954–1959, and a scientist.

During the period of the Azerbaijan People's Government, he was the commandant of the Tabriz loyalist units, Sayyed Ja'far Pishevari's assistant, and chairman of the Azerbaijan Radio Committee.

== Life ==
Mirgasim Mikayil oghlu Chashmazer was born in 1920.

He was a member of the Tabriz Committee of the Tudeh Party established in 1944. He was a member of the Central Committee of the Azerbaijan Democratic Party. From December 10, 1945, to January 15, 1946, he served as the commander of the Tabriz loyalist units. From January to June 1946, he was an assistant to S. J. Pishevari. On April 26, 1946, he became the head of the Tabriz radio station established near the Azerbaijan Radio Committee. On September 3, 1946, on the first anniversary of the establishment of the Azerbaijan Democratic Party, he was honored with the "Sattarkhan" order for his participation in the national democratic movement. In 1946, at the initiative of S. J. Pishevari, Mirgasim Chashmazer, and others, the "Babak Resistance Unit" was formed to resist the entry of the Tehran army into Azerbaijan

After the dissolution of the Azerbaijan People's Government, he came to Baku. There, he defended his academic work on "The Formation and Activity of the Azerbaijan Democratic Party" and obtained a doctoral degree in history sciences as a nominee for history. He engaged in scholarly activities at the Institute of Oriental Studies of the Azerbaijan National Academy of Sciences in the Department of "Southern Azerbaijan History".

In 1954, Mirgasim Cheshmazer was elected president of the Azerbaijan Democratic Party through elections during the party's conference. He held the position of president of the Azerbaijan Democratic Party from 1954 to 1959. He was also involved in the beginnings of the Azerbaijan National Liberation Movement in 1988.

He died in the year 2000.
