= Agasalim Atakishiyev =

Azerbaijani politician

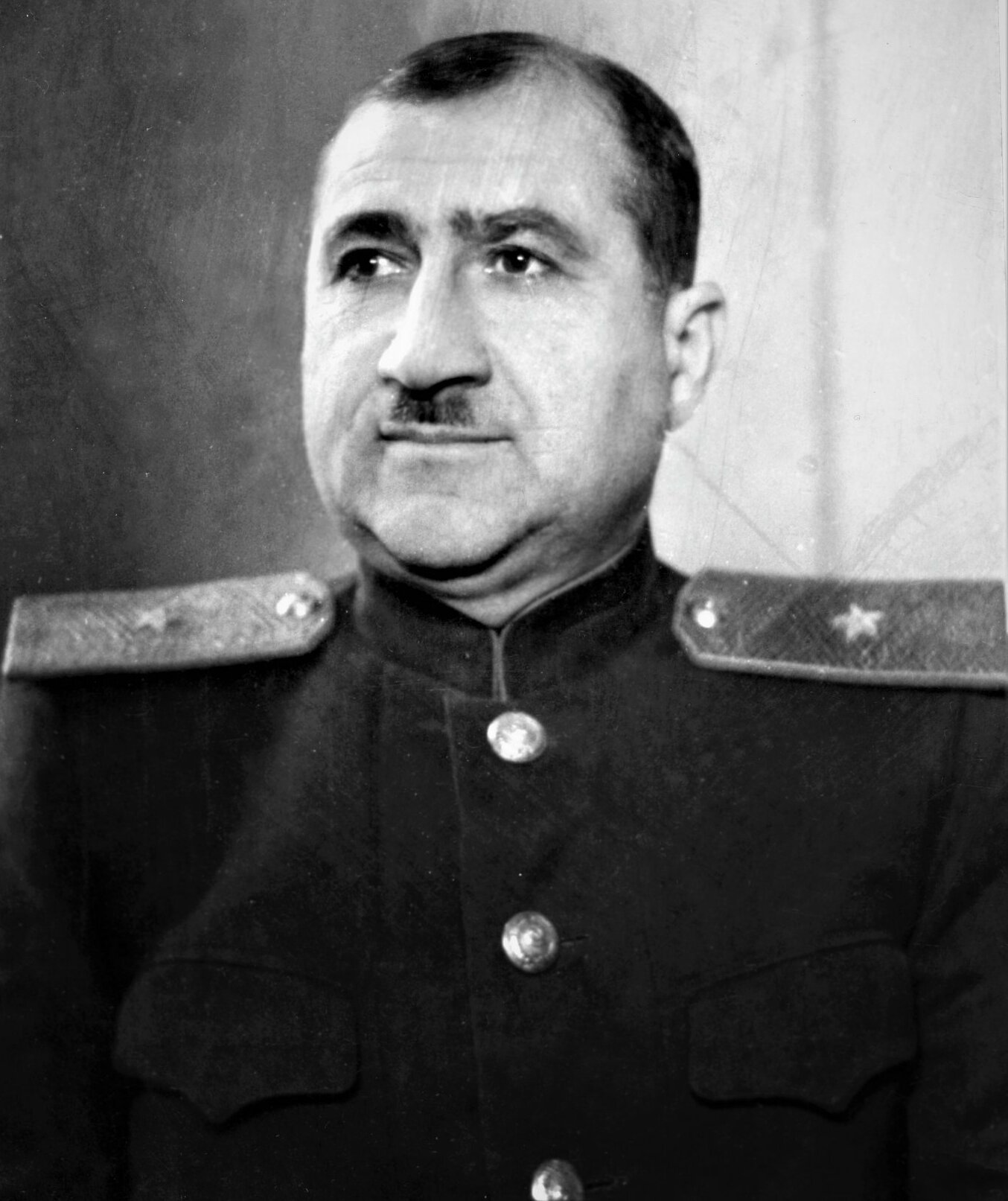

Minister of Internal Affairs of Azerbaijan
- In office May 1950 – June 6, 1953
- Preceded by: Mir Teymur Yagubov
- Succeeded by: Anatoli Quskov

Personal details
- Born: 1903 Baku, Baku Governorate, Russian Empire
- Died: 1970 (aged 66–67) Baku, Azerbaijan SSR, Soviet Union

Agasalim Atakishiyev (Azerbaijani: Agasəlim Atakişiyev; 1903–1970) was an Azerbaijani politician and soldier. He was Interior Minister of the Azerbaijan Soviet Socialist Republic, a major general in the Red Army and Deputy of the Supreme Soviet of the USSR of the 3rd convocation. Atakishiyev was one of the supporters of formation of the Azerbaijan People's Government in Iran.

== Early years ==
Atakishiyev was born into the family of a port tugboat boatswain. He was Azerbaijani by nationality.

He graduated from the 4-year higher primary school in Baku and 4 classes of the Baku real school in 1916, then worked as an apprentice spinning master at a weaving factory in Baku from 1918 to 1920. From April 1920 to May 1921 he was controller of the Baku Executive Committee.

== Soviet Career ==
In May 1921 he went to work as inspector of the criminal investigation department in Baku. In May 1924 he began his career with OGPU and its successors, the NKVD, the MVD and the MGB as well as comparable agencies within the Azerbaijan SSR.

During these years, he came to the attention of Lavrentiy Beria as a promising employee. From June 1932 to July 1933, he served in the Transcaucasian GPU. From July 1933 he worked in the OGPU-NKVD of the Azerbaijan SSR as Head of the SPO department of the NKVD of the republic. From June 1939 he was Acting Deputy Head of the URCM NKVD of the Azerbaijan SSR, and from November of the same year the Deputy Head of the URCM NKVD of the Azerbaijan SSR. From March 1940 he was Head of the Kirovobad District Department of the NKVD of the Azerbaijan SSR. From March 1941 to January 1942 he served as the Head of the URCM NKVD of the Azerbaijan SSR, Deputy People's Commissar of Internal Affairs for Militia. From May 1943 to June 1944 he was First Deputy People's Commissar of State Security.

Later he was a Rezident of the Foreign Intelligence Service of the NKVD of the USSR in Iran, under the cover of a consul, in 1945. Atakishiyev was head of the special operations in "Aliyev's mission", which was a group of 2500 persons sent to Tabriz to support the Pishevari government, an unsuccessful attempt to establish the Azerbaijan People's Government on Iranian territory.

From 1946 to 1950 he was Deputy Minister of State Security of the Azerbaijan SSR. Finally, from May 27, 1950 to March 26, 1953 he was Minister of Internal Affairs of the Azerbaijan SSR. He was also a member of the Bureau of the Central Committee of the Communist Party (Bolsheviks) of the Azerbaijan SSR, a deputy of the Supreme Soviet of the USSR and the Azerbaijan SSR.

== Downfall and trial ==
In May 1954, he was relieved of his post and in June 1954, he was dismissed from the Ministry of Internal Affairs. In November 1955, he was arrested and in May 1956, at the trial of the "Baghirov case", he was sentenced by a visiting session of the Military Collegium of the Supreme Court of the USSR to imprisonment in a correctional labor camp for a term of twenty-five years for violating socialist legality.

He was released on parole (conditional early release) in 1969. He returned from the camp as a terminally ill person. The well-known Soviet and Azerbaijani orientalist scholar, Hero of the Soviet Union, academician Ziya Bunyadov, helped bring about to his early release.
