= Jafar Kashif =

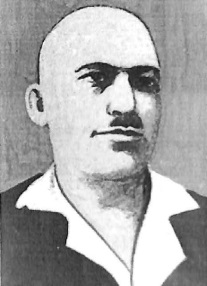
- Born: 1894; Mamaghan
- Died: 1946 or 1947; Tabriz, East Azerbaijan Province, Iran or Tehran, Tehran Province, Iran
- Occupation: poet

Jafar Kashif or Jafar Muhammadzadeh (1894, Mamagan – 1946 or 1947, Tabriz or Tehran) — Azerbaijani poet. He was a participant in the 21 Azer movement and a member of the Board of the Azerbaijani Society of Poets and Writers. After the fall of the National Government of Azerbaijan, he was killed by the Shah's forces.

== Life ==
Jafar Muhammadzadeh was born in 1893 in the town of Mamaghan. He lived in Tbilisi for a long time and published his poems in the press. In 1938, he was exiled to Iran.

In 1945, he joined the 21 Azer movement. On November 20, the Azerbaijani People's Congress began its activities at the Ark Theater in Tabriz. Jafar Kashif also participated as a delegate in the Azerbaijani People's Congress. He became known for his poems such as "To the Fairy of Freedom," "Leave Off," and others, which were published in the press. After the establishment of the National Government of Azerbaijan, he became a member of the Board of the Azerbaijani Society of Poets and Writers.

On December 5, 1946, the Shah's forces attacking in the direction of Miyaneh were stopped by the fedais led by Ghulam Yahya. People from various regions of Azerbaijan were appealing to the National Government to arm themselves and fight against the Shah's forces. After that, under the leadership of Ja'far Pishevari, a Defense Committee was established. The committee's first action was to declare martial law in Tabriz and to form volunteer units called "Babak." In the first stage, these volunteer units had 600 members. After that, Pishevari once again appealed to the Soviet Union for military support. However, this request remained unanswered.

On December 11, 1946, the Azerbaijani Provincial Assembly, in order to prevent bloodshed, decided that the Qizilbash People's Forces and the fedai forces should not resist the Shah's forces and should leave the battlefields. From that day on, before the Iranian army entered major cities, bandit groups of landlords and plainclothes gendarmes began massacres in these cities. These groups were called "Iranian patriots" by Tehran radio. The main goal of these groups was to destroy the democrats and ensure the entry of the Shah's forces into the cities. Tabriz and other cities of Azerbaijan were subjected to plunder and massacres. The National Government of Azerbaijan collapsed. On December 14, 1946, the Iranian army, supported by the United States and Great Britain, entered Tabriz. After that, the massacres and looting continued. Thousands of people were arrested and exiled. During these massacres, members of the ADF, fedais, as well as well-known poets such as Ali Fitrat, Sadi Yuzbendi, and Mahammadbagir Niknam were killed. Jafar Kashif was also killed during these events. There are different opinions regarding his death. According to some authors, he was killed in 1946 at Nazmiyeh Square in Tabriz; according to others, he was killed in 1947 in Tehran. According to Ali Tudeh, a member of the Azerbaijani Writers' Union and founder of the Tabriz National Philharmonic, Jafar Kashif was killed in front of his house.
