= Salamullah Javid =

Iranian politician and physician (1900–1986)

Governor of East Azerbaijan

Governor of Azerbaijan & Interior Minister of Azerbaijan's Government
- In office 1945–1946

Personal details
- Born: 1900 Khalkhal, Iran
- Died: 1986 (aged 85–86) Tehran, Iran
- Party: Azerbaijani Democratic Party & Communist Party of Persia

Salamullah Javid (Azerbaijani: Salamulla Cavid, Persian: سلام‌الله جاوید ; born 1900 in Khalkhal — death 1986 in Tehran) was an Iranian Azerbaijani physician and politician. By Ja'far Pishevari with the formation Azerbaijan People's Government in 1945, he was Governor of Azerbaijan and Interior Minister of Azerbaijan's Government. After the defeat of Azerbaijan People's Government he was imprisoned. After his release, he withdrew from political activities and in Tehran, got into medicine. Salamullah Javid also founded the Azerbaijan Cultural Society in Tehran.

== The works ==
- Two champions freedom
- Azerbaijani and Persian-language tutorial
- Political Diary
