= Tabriz arg theater =

- Interactive map of the Tabriz arg theater area

General information
- Type: Concert hall
- Architectural style: Russian
- Location: Tabriz Iran
- Construction started: 1920
- Completed: 1927
- Inaugurated: September 1927
- Renovated: 1946
- Destroyed: 1980
- Client: Ahmad Amir-Ahmadi
- Owner: The Red Lion and Sun Society of Iran

Design and construction
- Architecture firm: Russian engineers

The Lion and Sun Theater (Persian: تئاتر شیر و خورشید تبریز) or Arg was a theater in Tabriz which opened in 1927 and was destroyed in 1980.

== Construction ==
The building started in the reign of Reza Shah under the order of lieutenant general Ahmad Amir-Ahmadi to Red Lion and Sun Society. The design was inspired by the theater in St.Petersburg and was constructed with the help of Russian engineers and architects.

Its construction was completed in 1927 and was inaugurated in September of the same year. The dimensions of the main hall were 30 by 10 meters. The hall had 16 lodges, each with six two-story porches and a total seating capacity of about 800. Around the floors, ceilings and entrance hallway there was a unique Stucco. In respect for the principles of acoustics, the sound reinforcement tools not need to use.

Theater, fundamentally repaired by the Azerbaijan Democratic Party. A special place was built for the orchestra. Curtains and chandeliers were replaced and the theater was inaugurated for a second time on March 28, 1946 by Jafar Pishevari, head of the Azerbaijan People's Government.

== Destruction ==
The monument was destroyed in 1980 during construction for the Muslim Jumu'ah prayers in Tabriz.
