= Azizbeyov, Goranboy =

Əzizbəyov
- Location within Azerbaijan
- Coordinates: 40°41′45″N 46°37′37″E
- Country: Azerbaijan
- Rayon: Goranboy

Population
  - Total: 710
- Time zone: UTC+4 (AZT)
  - Summer (DST): UTC+5 (AZT)

Əzizbəyov (also, Azizbekov and Azizbekovo) is a village and municipality in the Goranboy Rayon of Azerbaijan. It has a population of 710.

== Notable people ==
- Ashig Huseyn Javan
