= Kazem Ordoobadi =

Kazem Ordoobadi is one of the last figures among the painters associated with the school founded in Iran by Mohammad Ghaffari, better known as Kamal-ol-Molk, one of Iran’s most celebrated master-painters. Kamal-ol-Molk stayed in France and Italy in the last years of the nineteenth century to study the works of Europe’s greatest artists. Kamal-ol-Molk style, inspired by his stay in Europe, is based on Realism and Naturalism. He founded the School of Fine Arts (Mostazrafe) in 1908 where European style of painting was taught together with Iran’s traditional painting. This was a breakthrough in the Iranian painting that for centuries was dominated mainly by miniatures used in illustration and decoration of books.

== Early life and family ==
Kazem Ordoobadi was born in 1919 and was the youngest of four children by Mohammad-Hassan Company and Rafieh Ordoobadi. His maternal grandfather, Haj Abbas Ordoobadi, emigrated from the city of Ordubad in Nakhchivan province, then part of the Russian Empire, to Iran and settled in Shiraz.

== Career ==
Ordoobadi started painting when he was in high school. His family had a long history of artists. His father was a skilled calligrapher and had written in the Nastaleeq (Persian: نستعلیق) style several works of famous Iranian poets. His cousin Khalil Negargar was a refined watercolor painter.

Ordoobadi’s earliest extant work is a small watercolor painting on a cardboard dated 1941, when he was 22 years old. The perfect use of colors and space shows that he already mastered his art. Later Ordoobadi’s acquaintance with Ostad Mahmoud Olia, a distinguished disciple of Kamal-ol-Molk, opened new horizons to him. Ordoobadi painted several portraits of personalities, family members and friends. The origin of his interest in portraits should be sought in the influence of Mahmoud Olia. In particular his earlier works come very close to the works of his master in terms of technique, lighting and color rendition. However he gradually gained assurance and departed from his master towards a more personal style.

The influence of Olia however remained intact in Ordoobadi’s pencil drawings. His pencil drawing copy of Murillo’s "Inmaculada de Soult" or Rembrandt's "self-portrait" are examples of Olia's influence. These works demonstrate the dexterity of the artist using his pencil to give life to lines and shades.

In Ordoobadi’s early oil paintings the inspirations of Olia could also be seen in the selection of colors, movements and brush strokes. His oil paintings evolved later when he got interested in landscapes and painted a number of works of the Russian realist painter Ivan Shishkin. The influence of realist landscape painters is visible in his later works depicting the life of Qashqai nomads of Fars in their natural environment.

Later on, Ordoobadi started studying impressionism and found a great interest in that school. He was impressed by the freedom in brush strokes, transparent colors and strong lights used by the masters. He painted several works in the style the French impressionist painter Pierre-Auguste Renoir and his later works were greatly influenced by this school.

Ordoobadi painted portraits of a selection of personalities which include outstanding figures associated with cultural and artistic circles of his time. His portraits of Fereydoun Tavallali (celebrated poet), Mirza Kazemi and Hashem Javid (man of letters), Naser Namazi (painter), Mohammad-Reza Moharreri (artist and doctor) show Ordoobadi’s active participation to the dynamic cultural and literary life of Shiraz.

After Obtaining his bachelor's degree in Physics in University of Tehran Ordoobadi started his professional life as a high-school teacher. He taught Physics and Art to high school students in Shiraz for thirty years. He acted as director of the Audio-Visual institute with the mission of taking culture to the heart of Fars province’s villages and nomad regions. During his numerous trips to the remote areas of Fars he studied nomads’ lifestyle and painted some of the scenes of their day-to-day life. Later he was appointed as director of Archeological Institute of Fars province and helped to preserve the cultural heritage and historical treasures of ancient Iran. Ordoobadi died in 2002 at age of 83.
