= Gholamhossein Bigdeli =

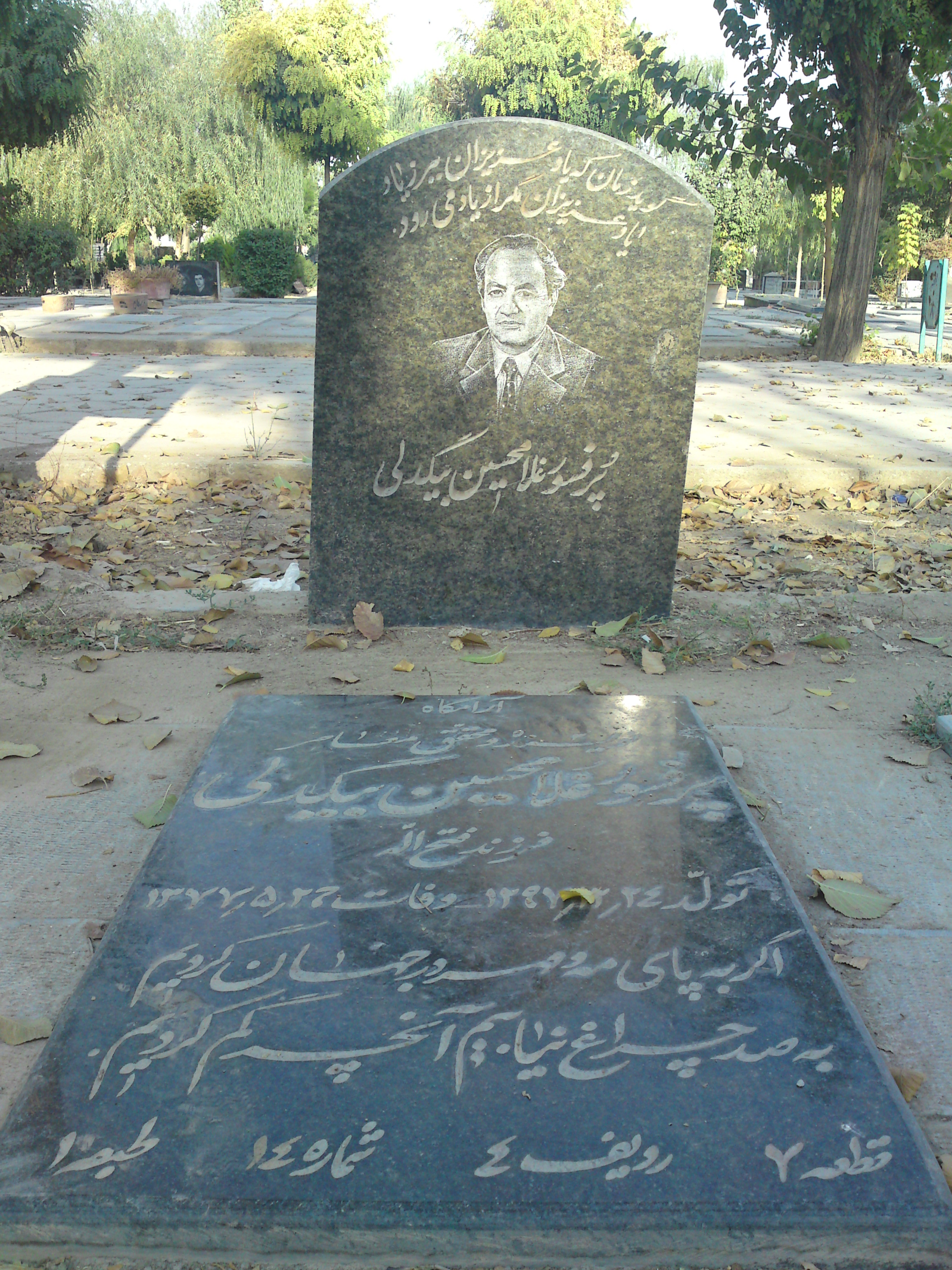
Tomb of Gholamhossein Bigdeli

Gholamhossein Bigdeli (Persian: غلامحسین بیگدلی) was born on 15 March 1919 in Dorakhloo (Zanjan).

He was among Soviet Union refugees who were then arrested in suspicion of spying and sentenced to 25 years of exile in Siberia. After eight years and with the death of Joseph Stalin, he was extricated and returned to Baku where he became a well-known literary figure.

Bigdeli returned to Iran in 1979 and acted as counsellor and translator in Cultural Revolution Committee.

He died on 16 August 1998 in Karaj.
