= Gholamreza Rouhani =

Iranian poet (1897–1985)

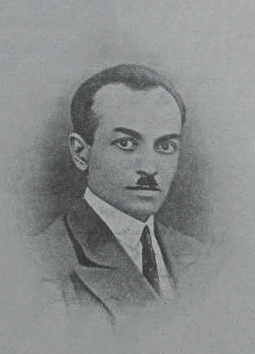
- Gholamreza Rouhani
- Born: 17 May 1897; Mashhad, Sublime State of Iran
- Died: 29 August 1985 (aged 88); Tehran, Iran
- Occupation: Poet
- Writing career
- Period: 1919–1985
- Notable work: Kollyat-e Ash'ar - Ajenneh
- Literary movement: Persian satire

Sayyed Gholamreza Rouhani alias Ajjeneh (Persian: غلامرضا روحانی, 17 May 1897 – 29 August 1985) was an Iranian humorous poet. Mohammad-Ali Jamalzadeh called him "the chief of humorous poets".

== Early life ==
Gholamreza Rouhani was born on 21 Ordibehesht 1276 A.P (17 May 1897) in Mashhad. In 1919 and at the age of 22, his poetry was published in several newspapers and various publications in Tehran such as Gooleh Zard, Nasim-e-Shomal, Nahid, Omid and Tofigh.

In 1921, Rouhani joined the Literary Society. The first forum was in the home of Shaikh-ol-raiis Afsar and later at the home of professor Mohammad Ali Naseh. In 1923, he became associated with some theater and music clubs including "Jameh Barbad" which was founded by Professor Ismael Mehrtash. Rouhani wrote many humorous poems for the theater and many of them became publicly famous.

In 1934, a collection of his poems called Tallyehe fokahyat Rouhani with an acknowledgment written by Mohammad-Ali Jamalzadeh was published. Due to popular demand it had to be reprinted again in 1935. In 1964, the complete collection of his poems entitled Kolyat ashar v fokahyat Rouhani, Ajjeneh (Complete humorous poems of Rouhani, Ajjeneh) was published by Sanai press.

These types of humorous poems were not widely recognized in the new period of Persian literature and very little was known about them. Gradually, Sayyed Gholamreza Rouhani's poems became a valuable source of inspiration for young people. Today, there are numerous "humorous" societies in Iran.

He was an active member of several literary societies such as Hakim Nezamy (Vahid Dastgerdi), Farhangstan (Mlkalshar-ay-baharr), Literary Society of Shiraz, Literary Society of Azrabadgan, Literary Society of Tehran, Hafez Literary Society, Literary Society of Saneb, Nasr Literary Society, Daneshoravan Literary Society, and other associations and literary circles. Rouhani was also active in creating songs as well as serious and humorous poems for music and theater clubs to be used in concerts and shows.

In September 1985, Sayyed Gholamreza Rouhani died at the age of 88 in Tehran, Iran. Professor Jamalzadeh called him "The chief of humorous poets" and Mohammad-Taqi Bahar remembers him in his poem after Iraj Mirza and Sayyed Ashrafaldyn Gilani.

== Poetry ==
Rouhani wrote all his work in the language of everyday people from the street and markets and he used proverbs common to everyday uses, while also avoiding any vulgar language. His work shows familiarity with the language of his time and the use of slang words and the grassroots opinion of his own time are very interesting. He was familiar with the use of rhymes and used them properly in his poems, with a manner that simply worked without offending.

Two notable elements of his poetry are his use of humor and imagery. His poetry has been described as accessible in style.

Sayyed Gholamreza Rouhani used humorous writing to show the problems of the society of his time and he speaks of the suffering of the Iranian social conditions such as, drugs, smoking, superstition, lack of education, the pain of single women, ignorance, illiteracy, war, and the imitation of western culture. he saw that education would be the solution to these problems and would move people away from being lethargic and lazy.

== Legacy ==
Today, many people in Iran recite his poems as proverbs without knowing who the writer is. Among them are the following:

"Mashine mashti mamdaly - nah bogh dareh nah sandaly".

"Halvai tan tanaii - ta nakhory nadany".

"Efadehha tebgh tebgh - sakha beh dorash vegh vegh".

"Seplsht ayad v zan zayad v mehman beresad".

== Bibliography ==
- Tallyehe fokahyat Rouhani (1934)
- Kolyat ashar v fokahyat Rouhani, Ajjeneh (Complete collection of his poems), Sanai Press with acknowledgment written by Sayyad Mohamad Ali Jamalzadeh, 1964
- Yeki Ye Poole Khorus, selection of Persian humorous poems
- Borhane wazeh (Clear proof)

== Sources ==
- Soroush Journal - Year VII - No. 308-20, October 1985, "Khandeh sazan and khandeh pardazan".
