= Navai =

Village in West Azerbaijan province, Iran

Navai Persian: نوايي
- Village
- Location within Iran
- Coordinates: 38°34′54″N 45°03′29″E
- Country: Iran
- Province: West Azerbaijan
- County: Khoy
- District: Ivughli
- Rural District: Valdian

Population (2016)
  - Total: 290
- Time zone: UTC+3:30 (IRST)

Navai (Persian: نوايي) (Note: Also romanized as Navā’ī) is a village in Valdian Rural District of Ivughli District in Khoy County, West Azerbaijan province, Iran.

== Demographics ==
=== Population ===
At the time of the 2006 National Census, the village's population was 343 in 89 households. The following census in 2011 counted 370 people in 108 households. The 2016 census measured the population of the village as 290 people in 92 households.
