= Fereidoon Tavallali =

Iranian poet, political commentator and archeologist

- فریدون توللی
- Born: 1917; Shiraz, Iran
- Died: March 1985 (aged 67–68); Shiraz, Iran
- Occupations: poet, political commentator, archeologist and considered intellectual

Fereidoon Tavallali or Fereydoun Tavallali ( 1917, Shiraz– March 1985, Shiraz; Persian: فريدون توللى). was an Iranian poet, political commentator, archeologist and considered intellectual. In poetry, Tavallali is of a second generation of Iranian modernists, the nowpardaz (New Wave poets).

== Biography ==
=== Beginnings ===
Tavallali, the son of Djalal Khan, was a contemporary poet and political commentator born in Shiraz in 1917.

Even at a young age, he showed talent as a writer and poet, being taught and encouraged at school by writers such as M. Hamidi, B. Passargade and D. Torbati. In 1932, Tavallali completed his studies in archaeology and began working in his chosen field in the province of Fars. After twenty years of Reza Shah’s dictatorship, the arrival of the Allies permitted some degree of liberalisation in the artistic world. At the beginning of this period, Tavallali published humoristic poems in the style of Golestan in Farvardin and Sourouch, two well-known journals (both of these publications were so accomplished that they toppled another political idol).

Towards the end of 1944, faced with the misery of everyday life, an oppressive and unjust ruling class, and successive epidemics of typhus and typhoid, Tavallali, like many other young intellectuals, joined the Communist party (Hezbe Toudeh). He fough against injustice on the side of the poor, publishing hard-hitting articles in the journals Sourouch in Shiraz and Korshide Iran and Iranema in Teheran.

=== Political undertakings ===
In 1945, Tavallali published Atafacil, a collection of political satires; a second printing appeared in the same year. He denounced the riots in Fars by means of which the Ghasghaie tribal leaders sought to seize power. He attacked Ghavam-Saltaneh, the powerful governor of Fars who had British support, as well as Seidzia-Tabatabai, who was at the origin of the autonomist revolt in Azerbaijan. He criticised these institutions openly without ever fearing for his own life. The poems Arradeh and Khan in Atafacil bear the marks of his combat in those tumultuous years.

In 1946, the province of Fars was subject to unrest stoked by the Ghasghaie leaders and all newspapers were prohibited. Tavallali left for Teheran where he continued to publish his writings and continued his political struggle while working in archaeology.

In 1947, Tavallali, Khalile Maleki, Nima Youshidj, Nader Naderpoor, Ebtehadj and many other young Iranian patriots resigned from Hezbe Toudeh . There were many reasons for their decision: disagreements between the party leaders, concessions made by the party to the Russians over petroleum resources in the north, support from the party for independentist factions on the orders of the Russian Communist Party. Tavallali began his sincerely-felt patriotic battle against Hezbe Toudeh. His poem Red Slaves and other satirical poems in the style of Atafacil were published in Andisheh No (New Thought), the journal of his friend and ally Mehdi Parham as well as in the review “Moyen Orient” [Middle East?].

1950 saw the publication of Raha (Liberation), a collection of lyric poems in a revolutionary free-verse style. Some of these poems are commonly recited in Iran: the river Caroune, Maryam, Afflicted love, etc.

Raha is the poet’s most-widely known book due to its original style. In the preface, Tavallali criticised the old-fashioned style of Persian verse. In the same year, he returned to Shiraz where he continued to agitate passionately against British imperialism and provided his support to Dr Mossadegh by writing articles for the highly influential journal Sedaye Shiraz (The voice of Shiraz).

Câravân, published in 1953, was written in the same satirical-didactic style as Atafacil.

=== Inner exile ===
After the coup d’état against Mossadegh in 1952, Tavallali fled Shiraz for Teheran and his house was ransacked and torched. He lived clandestinely for a year. The outcome of the coup was paralysing for the country’s democrats: he was unable to publish and was obliged to fall back on his own resources and kept quiet.

In 1958, he returned to Shiraz and became director of archaeology in the province of Fars.

In 1961 he was able to publish a collection of poems Nafeh (Musk), written in an inventive new style on psychological themes with an analytic tendency: “The Castle of Illusions”. The poem “Norouz” accurately expresses the spirit of this work.

In 1964, he became an adviser to the University of Shiraz.

After four years of silence, he published Pouyeh (The Path), a collection of traditional poems (ghazals).

In 1973, another collection Shagarf (Wonder) appeared, accompanied by a long foreword on the purity and genius of contemporary poetry in which he gave a clear account of his own poetry and defended the poet’s right to total freedom of expression.

== Critical appraisal ==
In the light of his biography, there are two distinct periods in his life:

- a first period from his youth until the coup d’état of 1952,
- a second period from 1952 until the end of his life.

In the first period, Tavallali was a revolutionary poet. He had a great admiration for the poems of Nima, since Nima did not adhere to the traditional verse forms. Though he distanced himself when he thought Nima was not only neglecting rhyme and rhythm but allowing his poems to become incomprehensible. During this period, Tavallali composed poems in a new, measured style which respected rhyme and rhythm without being tradition-bound. The collections Raha and Nafeh are written in this manner. The original composition, the clarity of meaning, the music of the words, the novelty and force of the ideas raise him to the summit of Persian poetry, alongside such great names as Ferdowsi, Nezami, Saadi, Hâfez.

His works Atafacil and Câravân are not only of literary merit, politically they can be considered the weapons of a patriotic poet fighting for freedom and historical significance.

In the second period, all the liberal leaders and those opposed to the Shah’s regime were assassinated, imprisoned or exiled, and the atmosphere in the country became stifling. Censorship had closed mouths and broken pens; and for twenty years, there was barely a glimmer of hope. Tavallali was obliged to withdraw from the political world and isolate himself; like Hâfez, he sought refuge in love poetry (ghazal). In his retreat, he composed poems critical of the dictatorship in force, but no review dared to publish them. His poems passed from hand to hand among friends and sympathisers. He managed to publish a few poems indirectly critical of the regime in the journal Bâhâre-e-Iran (Springtime of Iran), but this Journal was rapidly impounded and allowed to appear only without anything by Tavallali.

His ghazals and didactic works free of any political references were tolerated in literary magazines such as Sokhan, Vahide, and Yaghmâ.

Tavallali is seen as an accomplished poet and writer, as well as a well-known humorist. His Atafacil has been compared to Saadi’s Gulistan. His satirical portraits are considered to be one of the greats of Persian literature.

Like other poets of his time (Shamlu, Akhavan and Forugh), Tavallali experimented with the style of Nima Yooshij. Their poetry was in prose style with elements of Dadaism, automatism, futurism and surrealism.

Tavallali died in 1985 after a long illness. He is buried in the family tomb at Shiraz, not far from the poet Hâfez.

== Posthumous works ==
His three daughters, Nima, Fariba and Raha live in the United States and Europe. His wife Mahin, to whom he dedicated all his works, founded the literary circle “Khâne-ye-Feridoun” (Feridoun’s House) which brings together writers, poets, historians and researchers.

Mahin Tavallali issued two collections of her husband’s unpublished poems: Bâzgasht (The Return) in 1991 and Kabousse (Nightmare) in 2008.

== Works ==
- Al-Tafasil
- Pouye
- Raha (Tehran 1950)
- Karvan
- Nafe
- Bazgasht
- Le Coeur Hospitalier (in French)
- Mary
