= Mohammad Mostaghimi =

Iranian poet

Mohammad Mostaghimi محمد مستقیمی
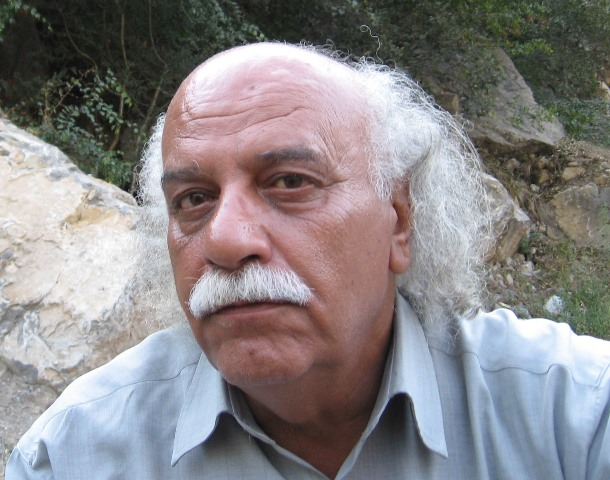
- Born: 23 December 1951 (age 74); Isfahan Province, Iran
- Occupations: Poet, Literary critic, Writer, Researcher, Literary theorists and Cari-kalamator
- Spouse: Simin Safayi Anaraki
- Children: Somayyeh, yaser, Sara
- Writing career
- Notable works: Hang the sky higher ! Shabo Abro Hāmoun; Ayinehpardazan Lovers die standing up!
- Notable awards: the Teacher Poetry Award; Isfahan Best Author Award

Mohammad Mostaghimi (born 23 December 1951) is an Iranian poet, writer, Literary critic, Researcher and Literary theorists. He started poetry at the age od 30.He is known as one of the pioneer poets of new Persian poetry in Isfahan.

== Education ==
=== Early education ===
Mostaghimi completed his early childhood education in the village of Chupanan in Isfahan Province. Then he went to Yazd to continue his education and could complete his secondary education.

=== Higher education ===
He stopped studying the field of Mechanics when he was a student at Iran University of Science and Technology. He became interested in Persian literature and received his master's degree at the University of Isfahan.
