= Abbas Qarib =

Iranian footballer

Personal information
- Full name: Abbas Qarib
- Date of birth: 1916
- Place of birth: Tehran, Iran
- Date of death: September 16, 2009 (aged 93)
- Position: Defender

Senior career*
Years	Team	Apps	(Gls)
- Toofan F.C.
- Bank Melli F.C.
- Daraei F.C.

International career
1941	Iran	1	(0)
- * Club domestic league appearances and goals

Abbas Qarib (Persian: عباس قریب) born 1916 in Tehran, Iran and died on September 16, 2009, was the last surviving member of Iran's first national football team.

In 1941, he played as a left-wing defender in games against Afghanistan and British Raj (India). In 1942, he played in a friendly in Tehran versus a British Army XI.

He was a clerk employed by Bank Melli and played for Bank Melli F.C. and Daraei F.C. in the 1940s.

He died following weeks of hospitalization for a broken pelvis.
