= Hashem Akbarian =

Iranian wrestler

Pahlavan Mirza Hashem Akbarian (Persian: میرزا هاشم اکبریان) (1897 (Persian year 1275) – 1971) was an Iranian practitioner of traditional wrestling (Varzesh-e Pahlavani).

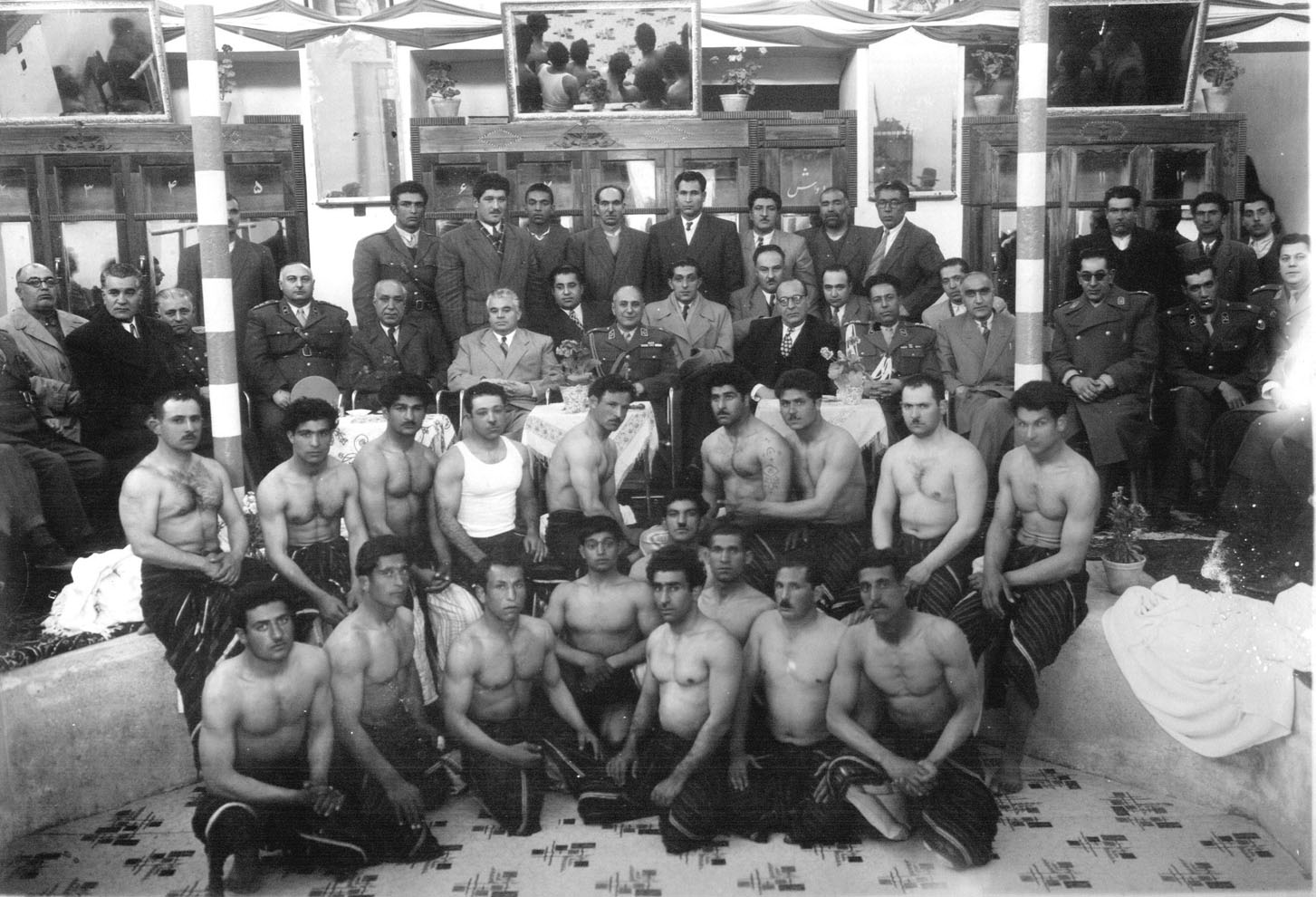
Chahar Fasl Zurkhaneh & Guests

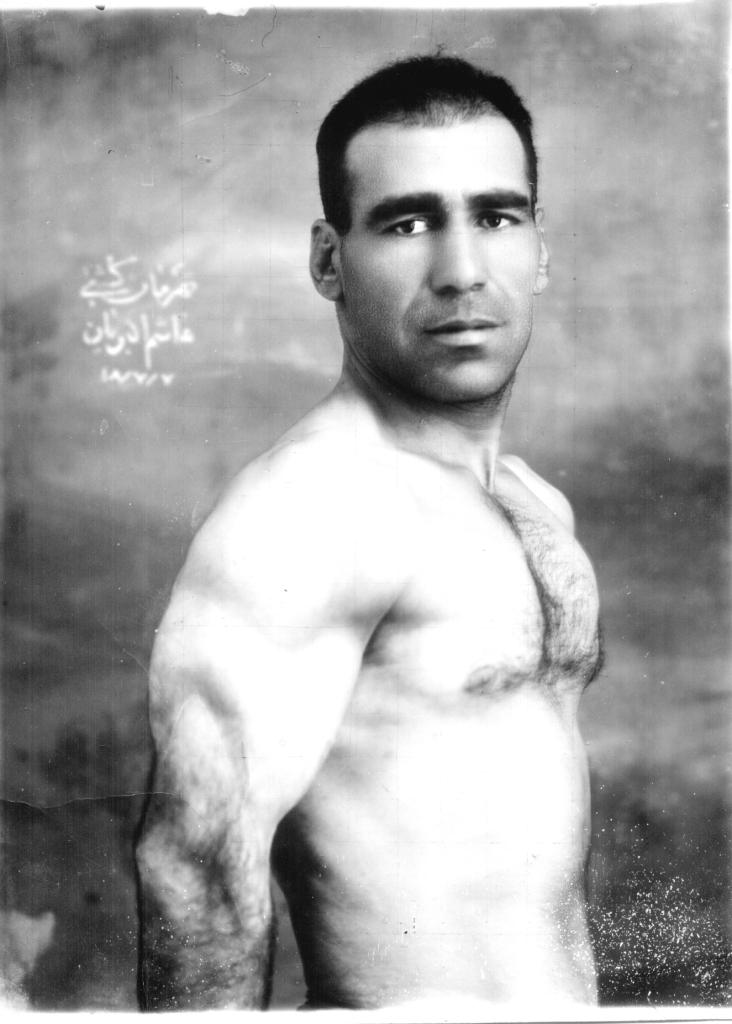
Hashem Akbarian

== Early life ==
Akbarian was born in Chaharsoogh Aligholi Agha Place in Isfahan, the former capital of Persia (Iran). The oldest son of Mirza Akbar, he lost his father at the age of seven and was forced to work as an apprentice carpenter to support his mother, his sister and his three brothers. When he started to train in wrestling at the age of around 20 in the Chaharsoogh Aligholi Agha Zurkhaneh (Persian: زورخانه چهارسوق علیقلی آقا), he was a young skilled carpenter owning his own shop. (Zurkhaneh literally means "the house of strength", equivalent to a gym or club). Over a period of ten years, he climbed the ranks by mastering the Zurkhaneh exercises including the traditional wrestling techniques. He was conferred with the rank of "Pahlavan" (champion) after defeating all wrestlers in his neighborhood Zurkhaneh and the challenging wrestlers from other Zurkhaneh. The wrestling matches were arranged by appointments or just by showing up unannounced in the sessions of the traditional Zurkhaneh workouts on Friday mornings.

== Establishment of own club ==
The seemingly unending marathon of crude wrestling matches and also requests from other Pahlavans who wanted a classier and bigger club convinced him to establish his own Zurkhaneh in 1939. He named it Chahar Fasl Zurkhaneh or Four Seasons Club. Located on Chaharbagh Boulevard in Isfahan, it was aimed at training young athletes inspired to reach the rank of Pahlavan in a more disciplined environment. Chahar Fasl Zurkhaneh immediately became the place for the government authorities and social elite curious to watch the artistic musical workout show with the concluding wrestling matches. Pahlavans and athletes from various places and cities would come to display their art.

Among many renowned Pahlavans who would visit his Zurkhaneh when in Isfahan were Pahlavan Haj Hesam Alsoltan Khoshnevisan and Pahlavan Haj Razaz.

== Social activity ==
Hashem's charismatic personality attracted people from all walks of life and he became respected in the urban and athletic community carrying out social welfare actions besides managing his furniture factory also located on Chaharbagh Boulevard.

== Last days ==
At the age of 60, he felt chest pains and his heart size was found to be twice the size it should have been, a sign attributed to excessive workout. He retired and closed the Chahar Fasl Zurkhaneh two years later in 1959. His chest pains were later found to have been caused not by excessive exercise but by a digestion problem he had from his youth. He died of a brain stroke at the age of 74 in 1971, leaving behind seven daughters and two sons named Reza Akbarian and Mohammad Akbarian.
