= Jamaluddin Mostaghimi =

Iranian academic

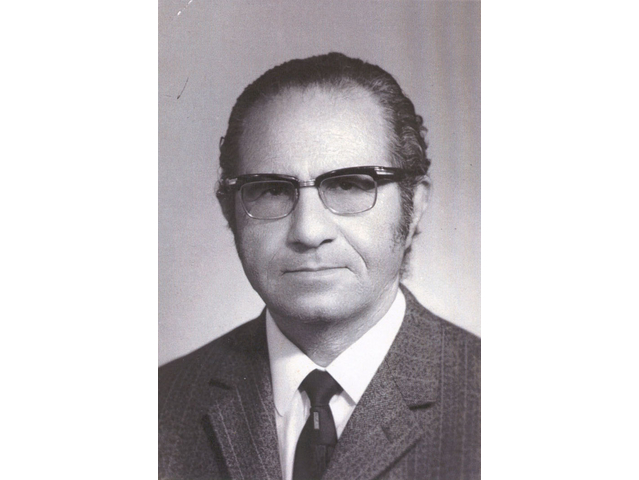
Jamaluddin Mostaghimi

Jamaluddin Mostaghimi was an Iranian physician. He was born in 1916 in Shiraz, Iran. He was the first assistant in the Laboratory of Anatomical Sciences and a leading figure in his field.

He had numerous publications in the field of basic sciences, the most notable being on autopsy. He was known as the father of the study of anatomy in Iran. He founded the first anatomy halls in at least eight universities of the country, including the Tehran University Hall.

He died on November 25, 2005 and was buried in the city of Mashhad.
