= Rasoul Parvizi =

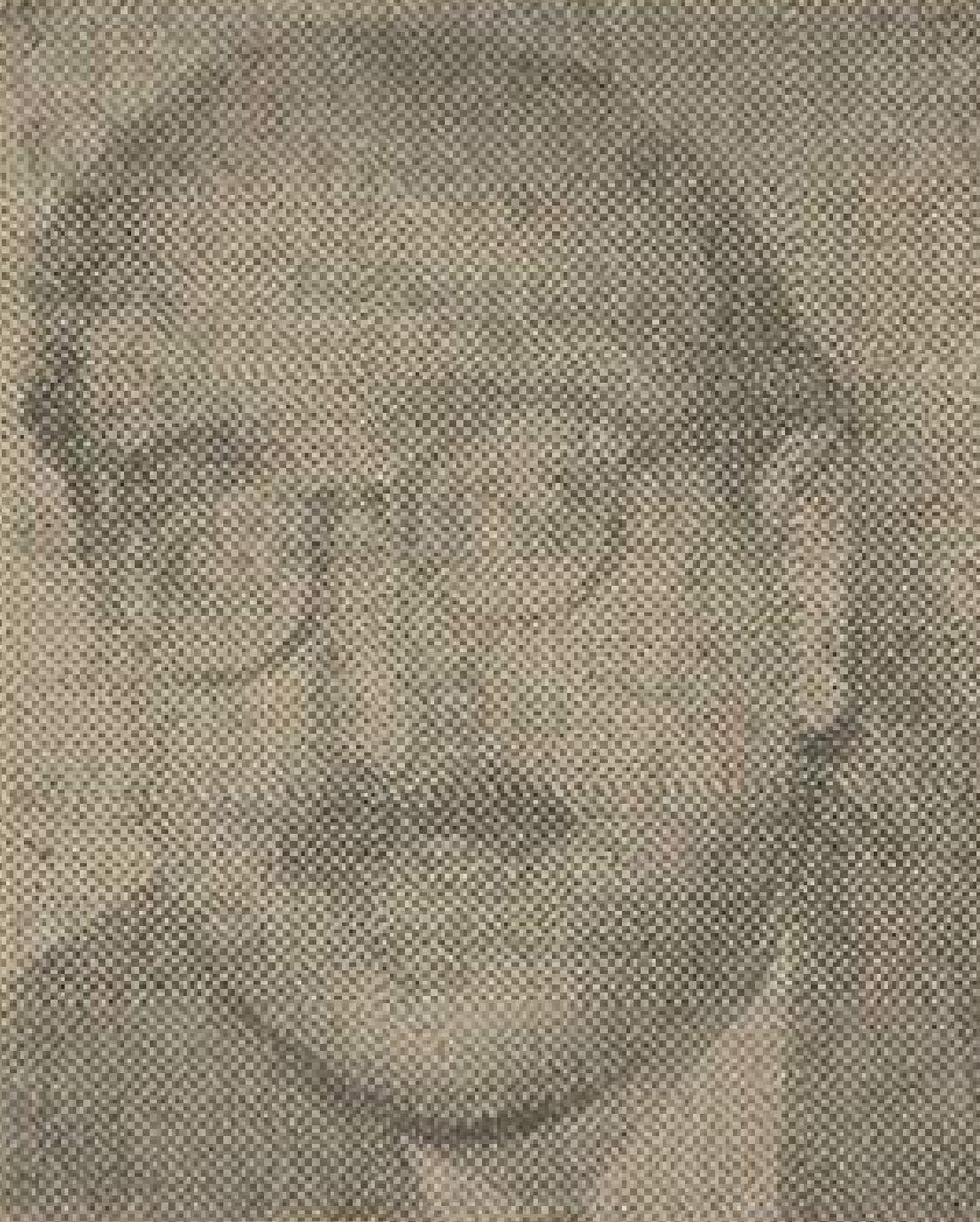
- Born: 1920; Tangestan County
- Died: 8 November 1977 (aged 58); Shiraz
- Occupations: Writer and politician

Rasoul Parvizi (Persian: رسول پرویزی )(1920– November 8, 1977) was an Iranian storyteller during the 1940s and 50s, and a politician in Iran. He served as the representative of the electoral district of Tangestan County in the National Consultative Assembly during the 21st, 22nd, and 23rd terms. He also held a seat in the 7th term of the Iranian Senate and served as the deputy to the Prime Minister, Asadollah Alam.

== Biography ==
Born in 1920 in Tangestan County, Bushehr Province, Rasoul Parvizi completed his primary education in Shiraz and continued his studies in Shiraz until the third year of high school. Faced with numerous challenges during this period, he discontinued his education. Subsequently, he worked as a librarian and teacher at Saadat School in Bushehr. In 1936, he successfully obtained a literary diploma and resumed teaching in Bushehr.

Parvizi wrote for magazines for years, identifying himself as one of the main representatives of the storytelling style of Jamalzadeh. In 1957, he published his first and most famous collection of stories, Belted Trousers. This collection remains his most renowned and successful work, comprising 20 short stories or memoirs written in a literary and colloquial style, with a simple and graceful approach. His second book, "Loli Sarmast," was published in 1967. Due to taking on governmental roles (senator), he did not continue writing. In his later years, Parvizi lost the vision in one of his eyes and abandoned writing. He died on November 8, 1977, at the age of 58, in Shiraz, and was laid to rest in Hafezieh. Recently, a book titled Rasoul's Stories has been published.
