= Ghulam Yahya Daneshian =

Iranian politician

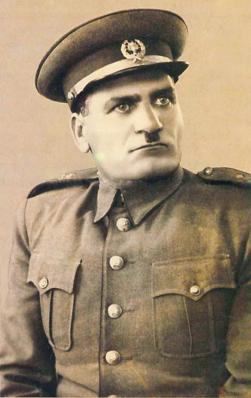
- Born: 1906; Sarab, East Azerbaijan, Iran
- Died: 1983 (aged 76–77); Baku, Azerbaijan SSR, Soviet Union
- Military career
- Allegiance: Azerbaijan Government
- Branch: Azerbaijan Government Army
- Service years: 1945-1946
- Commands: Commander of National Army in Azerbaijan People's Government; Deputy Minister of War

Ghulam Yahya Daneshian (Azerbaijani: Qulam Yəhya, Persian: غلام یحیی دانشیان, Russian: Гулам Яхья Данешиян; born 1906 in Sarab, East Azerbaijan — death 1983 in Baku) was an Iranian Azerbaijani politician and military. He was a general in the Azerbaijan's Government Army and Commander of National Army. Also Ghulam Yahya was Deputy Minister of War Ja'far Kavian in the Pishevari cabinet.
