= Medal of 21 Azer =

Military medal of Azerbaijan

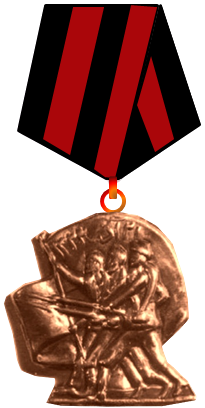
- Type: Individual award
- Awarded for: participants in the national democratic movement
- Country: Azerbaijan People's Government
- Status: is not awarded
- Established: 1946

Highlights
- Total: 20.000

Precedence
- Next (higher): Sattarkhan order

The Medal of 21 Azer was established in 1946 by the National Government of Azerbaijan. It was awarded to about 20 thousand people.

== History ==
On 2 December 1945, the National Government of Azerbaijan was proclaimed in Southern Azerbaijan. This event remained in history as the 21 Azer movement as the 12 December, according to the Iranian calendar, corresponded to the 21st day of the Azer month.
