= Azerbaijani Democratic Party =

Azerbaijani Democratic Party آذربایجان دموکرات فرقه‌سی
- Leader: Jafar Pishevari
- Chairman: Ghulam Yahya Daneshian
- Founder: Mir Jafar Baghirov
- Founded: 3 September 1945
- Dissolved: 1960
- Split from: Tudeh Party of Iran
- Merged into: Tudeh Party of Iran
- Headquarters: Baku, Azerbaijan SSR, USSR (1946–60); Tabriz, Iran (1945–46)
- Ideology: Azerbaijani nationalism Left-wing nationalism Communism; Marxism-Leninism; Pan-Turkism; Separatism
- Political position: Far-left

The Azerbaijan Democratic Party (Azerbaijani: آذربایجان دموکرات فرقه‌سی, romanized: Azərbaycan Demokrat Firqəsi; Persian: فرقه دموکرات آذربایجان, romanized: Ferqa-ye demokrāt-e Āzarbāyjān) was a pro-Soviet, Marxist-Leninist, separatist, and pan-Turkist party founded by Jafar Pishevari in Tabriz, Iran, in September 1945. It depended on the Soviet Union and was supported by it. The ADP was founded as an opposition party against the Pahlavi dynasty. The Soviet-supported Tudeh Party dissolved its Azerbaijan chapter and ordered its members to join the ADP. The ADP ruled the Soviet-backed Azerbaijan People's Government from 1945 until 1946 with Pishevari as premier.

== See also ==
- Iran crisis of 1946
- Anglo-Soviet invasion of Iran
