= Ja'far Pishevari =

Iranian politician (1892–1947)

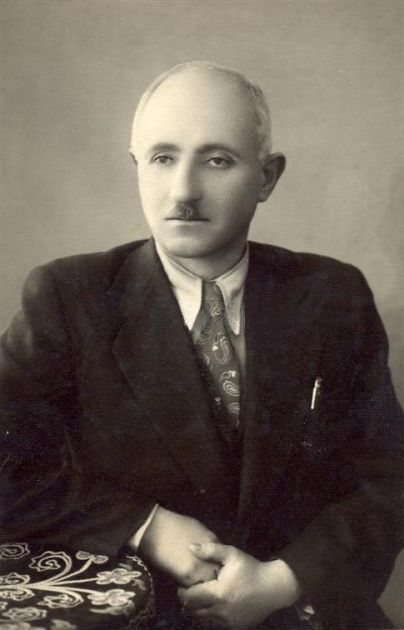

President of Azerbaijan People's Government
- In office 2 November 1945 – 15 November 1946

Member-elect of the Parliament of Iran
- In office Admission refused on 13 July 1944
- Constituency: Tabriz

Interior Minister of the Persian Socialist Soviet Republic
- In office 1921

Personal details
- Born: Jafar Javadzadeh; August 26, 1892 Zaviyeh-ye Sadat, Khalkhal, Sublime State of Persia
- Died: June 11, 1947 (aged 54) Baku, Azerbaijan SSR, Soviet Union
- Cause of death: Car crash
- Citizenship: Iran; Soviet Union
- Party: Azerbaijani Democratic Party
- Other political affiliations: Russian Social Democratic Labour Party; Communist Party (1920–1921)

Sayyed Ja'far Pishevari (Persian: سید جعفر پیشه‌وری; Azerbaijani: Seyid Cəfər Pişəvəri; Russian: Сеид Джафар Пишевари; 26 August 1892 – 11 June 1947) was an Iranian Azerbaijani communist politician who most-notably founded and led the Azerbaijani Democratic Party, the founding and ruling party of the Azerbaijan People's Government, the short-lived unrecognized secessionist state in northern Iran from November 1945 to December 1946.

== Life ==
He was born in Khalkhal in Ardabil province, Iran. He had lived in the Caucasus in the early 20th century and was introduced to Marxism during this period. He was a member of the Russian Social Democratic Labour Party.

He was a founding member of the Communist Party of Iran (not to be confused with the Tudeh Party), established in 1920, in Rasht. He became a journalist and communist activist in the 1920s.

In 1921, Pishevari served the Soviets as minister of the interior in the Persian Socialist Soviet Republic.

He was arrested and imprisoned during nine years in the late 1930s and early 1940s by the government of Reza Shah Pahlavi for his communist ideas and activities. He was released from prison after Reza Shah was deposed by the Allies in 1941. Pishevari was the Tudeh Party of Iran candidate for the Majlis and was elected, but was denied entry by the rest of deputies. Of the 100 votes cast, his credentials were rejected 47–50.

He then established the Azerbaijani Democratic Party with manifest material and organizational support from the USSR.

== Political career ==
The Soviet Union founded the communist Azerbaijan People's Government in November 1945 during their occupation of Northern Iran, making Pishevari its leader. It seems however that the strong man of this government was Mohammed Biriya, Minister of Propaganda and head of secret police trained by the NKVD. His government's actions, including organizing and arming local militias, disarming of regular Iranian military and police forces, setting up an independent judiciary based on the Soviet legal system, nationalising banks, levying taxes, land reform without ratification of the Majlis, using Azerbaijani as the official language and banning the usage of Persian, and setting up an alternative curriculum and educational system, were viewed with deep suspicion by the central government and other Iranians.

Following an agreement reached between the governments of Iran and the USSR under intense American pressure, who viewed Pishevari's government as a not-too-subtle scheme by the USSR to partition Iran, the Soviets removed their protection. Iranian armed forces, kept away from the provinces of Azerbaijan and Kurdistan by the Red Army presence since 1942, entered these provinces in November 1946. Pishevari's self-proclaimed government collapsed quickly, as many of the people welcomed the central government's troops. By December 1946, both Azerbaijan and Kurdistan were evacuated by the Soviet forces and the Iranian government re-established control over the USSR-occupied territories. It appeared as if Pishevari's government was becoming very unpopular, especially in larger cities where the merchants feared communism.

After the collapse of this short-lived republic, he fled to Azerbaijan SSR and died in a car crash in Baku in 1947.

== Legacy ==
His legacy is a matter of heated debate today. While many Iranians consider him as either a Soviet stooge or a traitor, he is considered a national hero for Azeri nationalists or a socialist revolutionary by the Iranian Left. He had the support of Joseph Stalin and the USSR in setting up his government.
