= Azerbaijan People's Government =

Unrecognized secessionist state in northern Iran from November 1945 to December 1946

Azerbaijan People's Government آذربایجان میللی حکومتی (Azerbaijani) حکومت خودمختار آذربایجان (Persian)
- 1945–1946
- Flag Coat of arms
- Anthem: Yaşa, yaşa Azərbaycan! "Long Live Azerbaijan!"
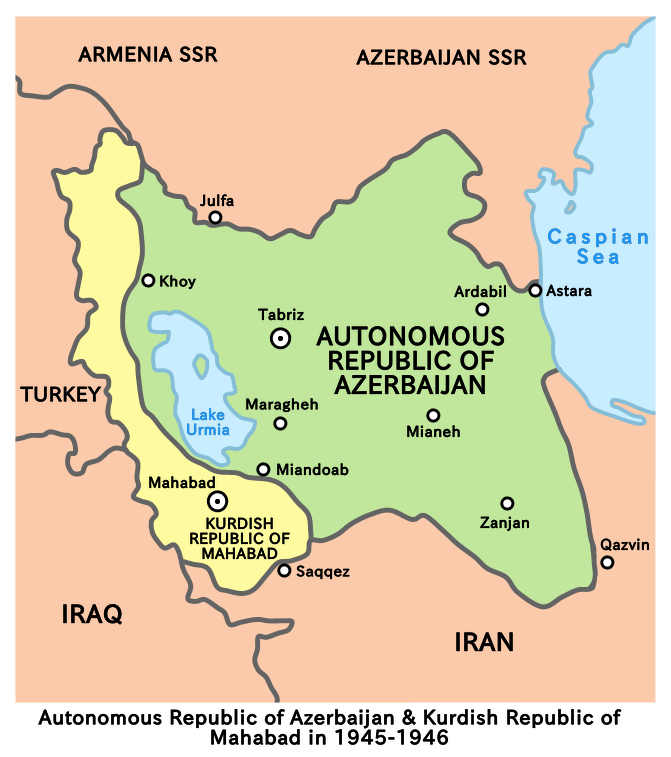
- Location of the Azerbaijan People's Government
- Status: Puppet state of the Soviet Union
- Capital: Tabriz
- Common languages: Azerbaijani
- Government: Marxist-Leninist state
- President
  - 1945–46: Ja'far Pishevari
- Historical era: Cold War
  - Established: 20 November 1945
  - Disestablished: 12 December 1946
| Preceded by | Succeeded by |
| Imperial State of Iran | Imperial State of Iran |
- Today part of: Iran

The Azerbaijan People's Government (Azerbaijani: آذربایجان میللی حؤکومتی - Azərbaycan Milli Hökuməti; Persian: حکومت خودمختار آذربایجان) was a short-lived unrecognized secessionist state in northern Iran from November 1945 to December 1946. Like the unrecognized Republic of Mahabad, it was a puppet state of the Soviet Union. Established in Iranian Azerbaijan, the Azerbaijan People's Government capital was the city of Tabriz. It was headed by an ethno-separatist and communist government led by the Azerbaijani Democratic Party, which also followed a pan-Turkist discourse. Its establishment and demise were a part of the Iran crisis, an early event in the Cold War.

== History ==
To supply the Soviet forces with war material through Iran, British and Soviet troops jointly occupied the country in August 1941. Soviet forces entering Iranian territory from the Armenian SSR and the Azerbaijan SSR and British and Indian forces entering from Iraq soon took the control of the country. On 16 September, the British forced Reza Shah to abdicate in favor of his son Mohammad Reza Shah Pahlavi, who ruled until 1979.

With the dethronement of Reza Shah in September 1941, Soviet troops captured Tabriz and northwestern Iran for military and strategic reasons. The Azerbaijan People's Government, set up by the Soviets, under leadership of Ja'far Pishevari was proclaimed in Tabriz in 1945. Lavrenti Beria was nominally in charge of the operation, but delegated it to Mir Jafar Baghirov, the First Secretary of the Communist Party of Azerbaijan in Baku. The Democratic Party of Azerbaijan was also created by the direct order of Joseph Stalin and capitalized on some local people's dissatisfaction with the centralization policies of Reza Shah. It was supplied with money and weapons by the USSR. Stalin wanted to make pressure on Iran to get an oil concession in Iranian Azerbaijan. During this time, a revival of the Azerbaijani literary language, which had largely been supplanted by Persian, was promoted with the help of writers, journalists, and teachers from the Azerbaijan SSR. In the quest of imposing national homogeneity on the country where half of the population consisted of ethnic minorities, Reza Shah had previously issued in quick succession bans on the use of Azerbaijani language on the premises of schools, in theatrical performances, religious ceremonies, and, finally, in the publication of books.

The U.S. supported the Iranian complaint against Soviet actions lodged with the Security Council in Resolution 3 and Resolution 5; in mid December 1946, the U.S. supported the shah's government in sending the Iranian army to re-occupy Mahabad and Azerbaijan. The leaders of the Azerbaijan enclave in Iran fled to the Azerbaijan SSR, and the leaders of the Kurdish Republic were tried and sentenced to death. They were hanged in Chwarchira Square in the center of Mahabad in 1947.

1947's efforts centered on the issue of Soviet designs on Iran's northern oil resources. Following the election that year of a new Majlis, the newly elected deputies were reluctant to ratify the Soviet-Iranian oil agreement, which had been concluded under duress in March 1946 and had granted the Soviets 51% ownership and de facto control. On September 11, 1947, U.S. ambassador George V. Allen publicly decried intimidation and coercion used by foreign governments to secure commercial concessions in Iran, and promised full U.S. support for Iran to freely decide about its own natural resources. With this unequivocal encouragement, the Majlis refused to ratify the Soviet oil agreement on October 22, 1947; the vote was 102 to 2.

== Establishment ==
The Firqah-i Dimukrat, or Azerbaijani Democratic Party (ADP), publicly announced its formation in Tabriz on 3 September 1945 by a group of veteran communists headed by Ja'far Pishevari. After the announcement, the communist, Soviet-supported Tudeh party dissolved its Azerbaijan chapter and ordered its members to join ADP. ADP expanded throughout Iranian Azerbaijan, and initiated a local coup d'état with help from Soviet army, who prevented the Iranian army from intervening. During the first week of September 1945, the Azerbaijani Democratic Party, led by Ja'far Pishevari, a long-time leader of the revolutionary movement in Gilan, declared itself to be in control of Iranian Azerbaijan, promised liberal democratic reforms, and disbanded the local branch of Tudeh. Later in September 1945, at its first congress, the Azerbaijani Democratic Party authorized the formation of a peasant's militia. This militia started a bloodless coup on 18 November 1945 and by 21 November they had captured all remaining government posts in the province, and Iranian Azerbaijan "became an autonomous republic under the direction of a 39-member national executive committee". The power seems to have been exercised by Mohammed Biriya, the Minister of Propaganda and head of the local secret police.

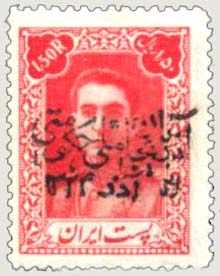
A Overprinted Iranian stamp with the portrait of Mohammad Reza Shah issued under the name of National Government of Azerbaijan.

At the same time, the US was steadily increasing its military assistance to the Iranian government. Under pressure by the Western powers, the Soviet Union revoked its support of the newly created state and the Iranian military succeeded in re-establishing Iranian rule in November 1946. According to Tadeusz Swietochowski:

As it turned out, the Soviets had to recognize that their ideas on Iran were premature. The issue of Iranian Azerbaijan became one of the opening skirmishes of the Cold War, and, largely under the Western powers' pressure, Soviet forces withdrew in 1946. The autonomous republic collapsed soon afterward, and the members of the Democratic Party took refuge in the Soviet Union, fleeing Iranian revenge. In Tabriz, the crowds that had just recently applauded the autonomous republic were now greeting the returning Iranian troops, and Azerbaijani students publicly burned their native-language textbooks. The mass of the population was obviously not ready even for a regional self-government so long as it smacked of separatism.

=== Soviet support ===
Declassified documents from the Cold War implicates the USSR in forming the government of Pishevari by the direct orders of Stalin. The Soviet military supported the new autonomous entity and prevented the Iranian army from restoring governmental control over the area. After the Soviet withdrawal, Iranian troops entered the region in December 1946 and Pishevari and his cabinet fled to the Soviet Union. According to Prof. Gary R. Hess:

On December 11, an Iranian force entered Tabriz and the Peeshavari government quickly collapsed. The Soviet willingness to forego its influence in (Iranian) Azerbaijan probably resulted from several factors, including the realization that the sentiment for autonomy had been exaggerated and that oil concessions remained the more desirable long-term Soviet Objective.

== Dissolution ==
On 13 June 1946, an agreement was reached between the Central Government in Tehran and the delegates from Azerbaijan, headed by Pishevari. Under the agreement, Pishevari agreed to abandon the APG's autonomy, to relinquish its ministries and premiership, and to become once more part of Iran. Its parliament was to be transformed into a provincial council – a system recognized and provided for in the Iranian Constitution.

By mid-December 1946, the Iranian army, backed by the United States and the British, reentered Tabriz, thus putting an end to Azerbaijan People's Government after a full year of its existence. The army’s re-entry was met with an enthusiastic welcome by the Azerbaijani people. Christopher Sykes, who witnessed the event, writes: “Nowhere else have I seen such enthusiasm among the people except in France in 1944.” In Tabriz itself prior to the arrival of the army the populace rose and executed all the Democratic officials they could lay their hands on. Approximately 500 supporters of the Ferqeh were killed. In contrast, the U.S. Supreme Court Justice, William O. Douglas claimed that, while the Red Army had been on its best behavior when stationed in Azerbaijan, the Iranian Army behaved as an occupying force and brutalized the local inhabitants. The beards of peasants were burned, their wives and daughters raped. Houses were plundered and livestock were stolen. After the Army's return, absentee Azerbaijani landlords demanded both current rents and unpaid arrears from the Pishevari period, further straining peasant households. In addition, Pishevari's forces took livestock and grain when they withdrew.

Many of the leaders took refuge in the Azerbaijan SSR. Ja'far Pishevari died in a car accident in Baku in 1947. Prime Minister Kordary was jailed for many years by the Shah and later released due to the efforts of his brother Kazem Kordary.

== See also ==
- Republic of Mahabad
- Mirgasim Cheshmazer
- Mahammad Hatami Tantekin
- Hasan Urangi
