= Habib Saher =

Azerbaijani poet, writer, translator

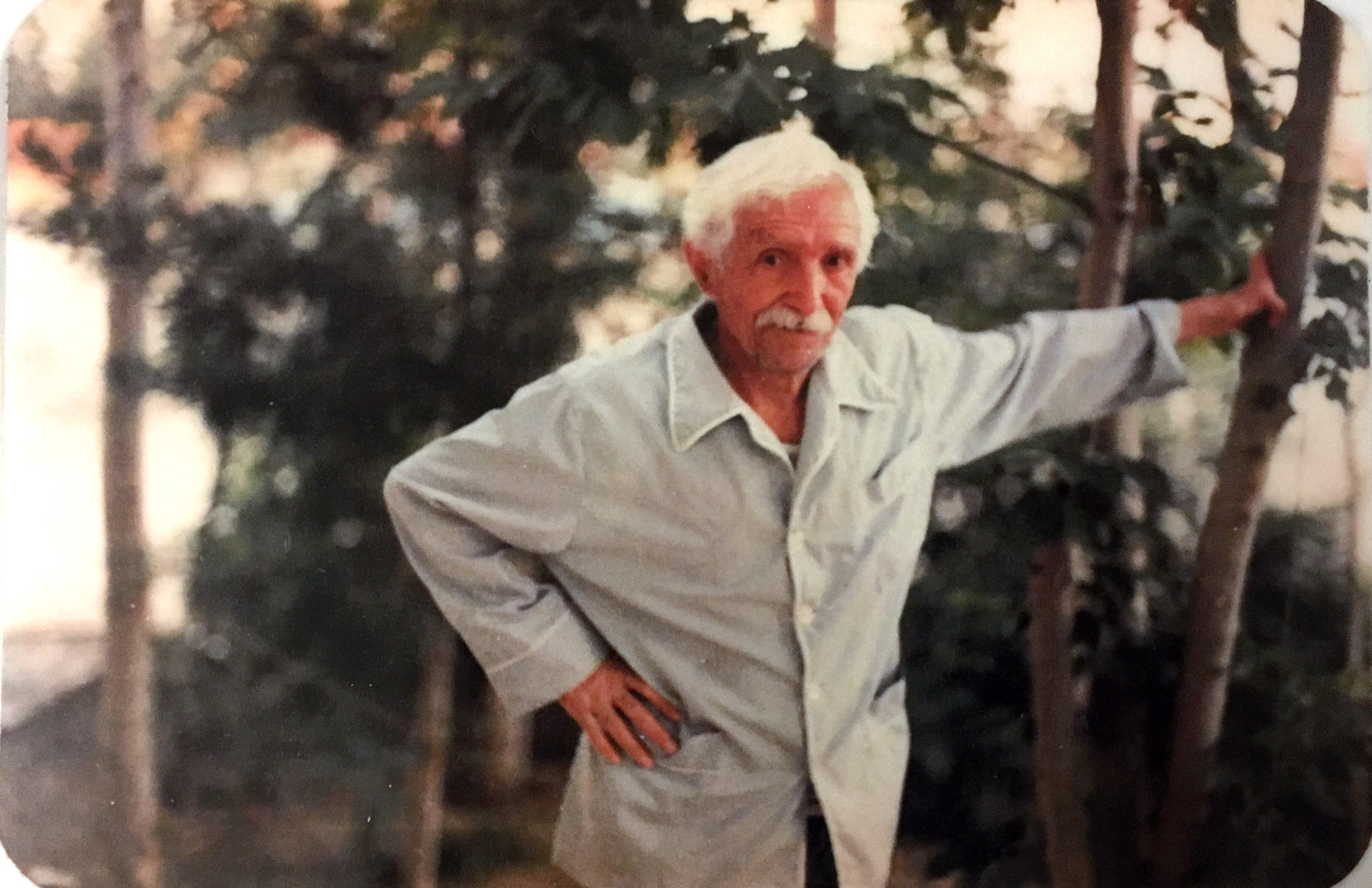
- Born: 1903; Tark, Mianeh, Iran
- Died: 1988; Tehran, Iran
- Occupation: poet, fiction writer

Habib Saher (Persian: حبیب ساهر, Azerbaijani: Həbib Sahir, b. 1903 in Mianeh, Eastern Azerbaijan — d. 1988 in Tehran), was an Azerbaijani poet, writer, translator and literary researcher. The founder of Turkish free poetry in Iran.

Even after the establishment of the National Government of Azerbaijan, he wrote the "Mother Language" textbook for schoolchildren. He wrote articles in the press with signatures such as "Aydın", "Ülker", "Ağ".

He was exiled many times for his activities. After the Iranian Islamic Revolution, he committed suicide by hanging himself.

== Life ==
Mir Habib Qawami was born in 1903 in Sirkhab neighborhood of Tabriz. First, he learned to read and write in Arabic at the "Sardaba ustu" mullah school. Later, he received primary education at "Madaris-i Motamida" and "Rushdiyya" schools. After finishing his primary education, he entered the "Madrasei Mubarak-e Mahammadiyya" high school. And here he was a classmate of Muhammadhuseyn Shahriyar.

Mirza Tagikhan Rafat Tabrizi, who was a teacher of French language and literature during his studies at the high school, was his teacher. Under the influence of Mirza Tagikha, Habib Sahir became interested in Western literature. He gets acquainted with the publications "Rasmli ay" and "Sarvati-funun" published in Turkey. Here, Jalal took the nickname "Sahir" because he liked Sahir's works. Together with their fellow students, they publish "Anjuman-i Rafat" and "Adab" newspapers. After the assassination of Sheikh Mohammad Khiabani and the collapse of Azadistan, both newspapers ceased publication.

After finishing his education, he works as a teacher for some time. He sends part of the money he earns to his family in Tabriz, and the rest he collects in order to get a higher education in Turkey.

Habib Sahir went to Turkey in 1927. He worked as a teacher of Persian language and literature for two years at the "Dabistane-Iraniyan" school opened for Iranians living here. In 1929, he was admitted to the Faculty of History and Geography of Istanbul University. Here he gets acquainted with contemporary Turkish and French poetry and learns the French language. During his studies, he translated French poet Charles Baudelaire's new poems ("The Enemy"), as well as Lamartine's famous poem "Lake", Sadi's "Gülüstan", Hafiz Shirazi's ghazals into Azerbaijani Turkish. He wrote and defended his diploma thesis entitled "Natural Geography of Iran-Azerbaijan". With the advice of his teacher Sadi Bey, he published his diploma work serially in the magazine "Azərbaycan Yurd Bilgisi".

After completing his studies, he returned to Tabriz in 1933. With the appointment of the Department of Education, he started wordking as a geography teacher at a school in Tabriz. In addition, he also wrote textbooks for students. In 1936, by the decision of the Tabriz Ministry of Education, his textbook "Geography of Khamsa" was published in Zanjan and was awarded a prize. Later, he is sent to Zanjan to work as a teacher.

In 1941, Azerbaijani intellectuals who came to Tabriz as part of the Azerbaijan SSR delegation caused positive changes in the literary and cultural environment of the city. During this period, Habib Sahir's poems, translations and articles were published in newspapers and magazines such as "Azerbaijan", "On the Homeland", "Shafaq", "Azad Millat", "Yeni Sharq". During the years he lived in Tabriz, his Persian books "Shaqaiq", "Shadows", "Night Legend", "Selected Poems" were published. After the establishment of the Azerbaijan National Government in 1945-1946, he wrote the "Mother Language" textbook for schoolchildren and appeared in the press under the signature "Aydin".

After the collapse of the National Government, he continued teaching. He continues to write poems and stories in his native language with secret signatures such as "Aydın", "Ülker", "Ağ". After this activity was revealed, a sentence was passed and he was exiled to Ardabil. Here, a teacher starts working at the "Safaviyya" school. During his time at the school, he was constantly warned because his classes were held in Azerbaijani. As a result, after 3 years, he was removed from Ardabil and exiled to Qazvin. Since there was no change in his activities here, he was exiled to the city of Sari located in Mazandaran. Because he contracted malaria, he was sent back to Qazvin, where he lived for 13 years. Later, he moved to Tehran.

In 1965, his first book of poetry written in his native language "Lyric Poems" was published. His books "Morning shines", "Lights that don't go out", "Scattered memories", "Kovshan" were published after the Iranian Islamic Revolution. In addition, he also wrote poems in French and short stories in Arabic.

== Family ==
Habib Sahir's grandfather moved to Tabriz from the city of Tark, Miyana. His father Mir Qavam Sahir was kidnapped and killed in 1908 during the Mashruta movement. His mother was from the Bayat tribe. There were 4 brothers and 1 sister in the family.

In 1946, when he was 43 years old, he married Nusrat ul-mulk Nuri. From this marriage, sons named Hamid and Said, daughters named Manisa and Sureyya were born.

== Death ==
In 1988, after receiving news that he would be arrested again after the Iranian Islamic Revolution, he committed suicide by hanging himself from the window of his apartment in the city of Aryashahr near Tehran (now Sadeghiya). He was buried in "Behishti-Zahra" cemetery in Tehran.

== See also ==
- Hamid Mammadzadeh
- Ismayil Jafarpour

== Source ==
- Vafa Aliyev (2000). Hüriyyət fədaisi (Həbib Sahirin taleyi və ədəbi irsi) (PDF). Baku: Ozan. p. 119.
- Parvana Mammadli (2015). Cәnubi Azәrbaycan: әdәbi şәxsiyyәtlәr, portretlәr (PDF). Baku: Sabah. p. 200. ISBN 978-9952-453-43-0.
- Vafa Aliyev (2005). Habib Saher. Selected works (PDF). Baku: Lider. p. 192. Archived from the original (PDF) on 2016-03-05.
