= Suicide in Iran =

Coin engraving of Khurshid Spahbed. He, who was the last Spahbed of Dabuyid dynasty in Tabaristan, after losing the war against Arabs in the year 761, committed suicide at the age of 27.

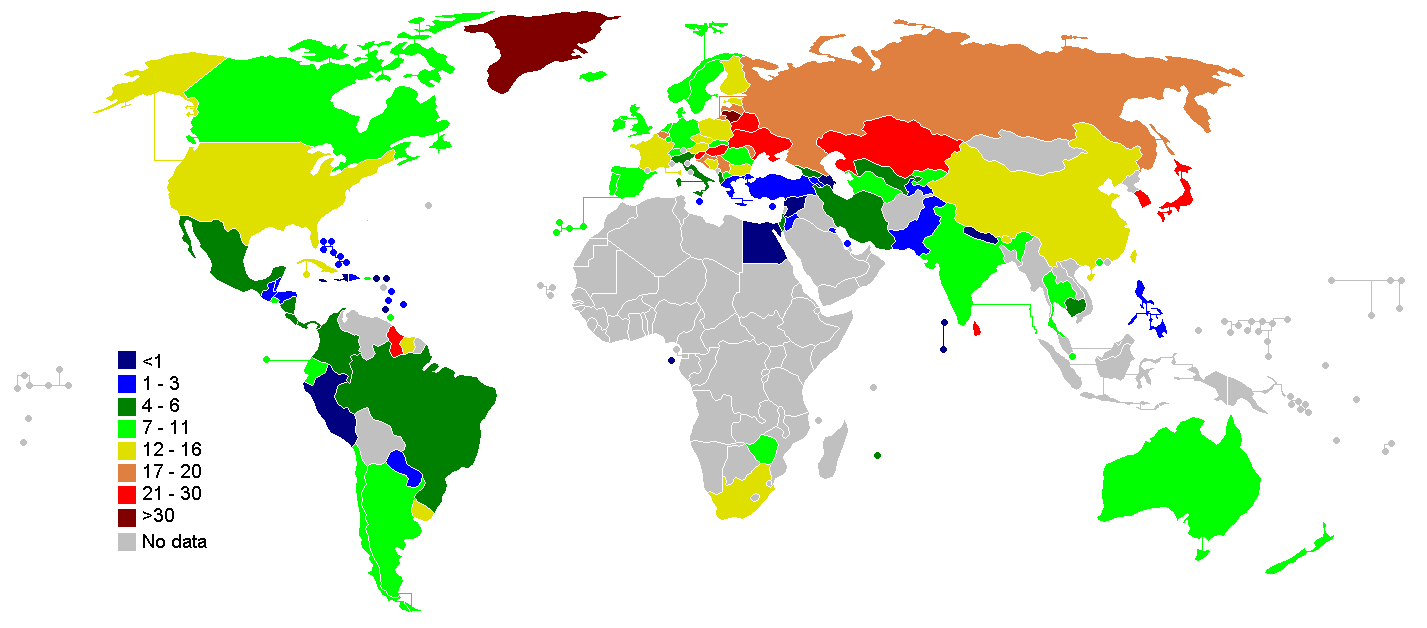
Iran's suicide rate per 100,000 people compared to other countries, according to the World Health Organization, Geneva. Peeter Värnik in 2012.

Suicide in Iran is believed to be a growing concern in recent years within the nation. According to statistics most of the people who commit suicide are between the ages of 15 and 35.

Economic problems, ongoing conflicts, mental illnesses, environmental changes, social media, natural disasters, health crises, cultural obligations, police brutality, conspiracy theories, terrorist attacks, negative news, sexual misconduct, cyberbullying, genetic makeup, political issues, and social pressures are the major factors for those who commit suicide in Iran. Iranian Legal Medicine Organization statistics are classified to avoid a negative sentiment.

== Statistics ==
Suicide in Iran is believed to be a growing concern over recent years. According to World Health Organization in 2014 the suicide rate of Iran was 5.3 in every 100,000 people. In that year, the rate of suicide based on gender was 3.6 for women and 7 for men. Seasonally, most suicides occurred in summer with the rate of 35.2% of all suicides; 13% higher than any other season. Based on a meta-analytical research, in Iran, the rate of non-fatal and fatal suicide attempts among married couples is higher than other groups. The statistics provided by the Medical Jurisprudence Organization of Iran show that 54% of suicides ending in death occurred among people under 30 years of age and that people who lived in the cities had statistically higher rates of suicides than people living in rural areas.

== Reasons ==
Table 1: Reasons of suicide among 7,553 subjects referred to Loghman Hospital in Tehran from 1970 to 1972.
Reasons Age period	Love-related issues	Family-related issues	Society-related issues	Finance-related issues
10–14	67	86	4	1
15–19	632	1٬268	134	108
20–24	669	1٬121	272	155
25–34	377	944	139	75
35–44	269	423	116	67
45–54	36	161	44	10
55–64	24	78	11	5
65 and older	9	87	26	6
N/A	35	61	17	15
Total	2,118	4,229	763	443

According to the field research questionnaires given to the suicidal patients referred to Loghman Hospital from 1970 to 1972, family-related issues, with a prevalence of 56%, were the most important reasons of committing suicide. (Table 1). In this study, family-related issues consisted of conflicts between married couples and their parents, and also improper interpersonal relations between parents and their children or other siblings with each other. Such issues started from the ages of 15 to 19 and were most frequent among 20- to 24-year-olds. These two age periods combined were the cause of 56% of total suicides related to family issues. In general, 81% of suicides related to family issues were committed by youths from 10 to 34 years old. In addition, family-related issues, were the most prevalent reason among children from 10 to 14 years old (33%).

In the aforementioned study (Table 1), love-related issues with a prevalence of 28% were the second most frequent reason of suicide and the most frequent age period was from 15 to 24 (61٪). In this study, housing, unemployment, and educational failure, have been categorized under society-related issues which was the third reason of suicide with the highest frequency in patients from the age of 20 to 24 years old. In this study, financial issues were the lowest cause of suicide with 6% of all committed suicides.

In a study done on 260 suicides referred to the Medical Jurisprudence Organization of Iran in the first half of 2004, according to the answers that the families of these suicide victims provided, the most prevalent reasons for suicide among men were mental disorders (41%) and financial problems (31%); (Note: These percentages are related to 61% of cases in which the reasons for suicide were determined. In 39% of the cases, the families of the suicide victims either didn't know or didn't want to release information.) and among women were family conflicts (54%) and mental disorders (31%). (Note: These percentages are related to 66% of cases in which the reasons for suicide were determined. In 34% of the cases, the families of the suicide victims either didn't know or didn't want to release information.) The most prevalent mental disorder among both men and women was depression and in 27% of the cases, the victim had a long history of hospitalization.

== Demographics ==
Table 2: Age and gender of subjects who committed suicide by poisoning and referred to Loghman Hospital in Tehran from 1970 to 1972.
& Date Gender Age	1970			1971			1972			Total
& Date Gender Age	Men	Women	Total	Men	Women	Total	Men	Women	Total	Total
10–14	29	76	105	30	50	80	11	61	72	257
15–19	363	824	1٬187	243	283	526	237	462	699	2,412
20–24	423	512	935	223	350	573	372	416	788	2,296
25–34	338	462	800	260	305	565	251	423	674	2,039
35–44	136	232	368	120	150	270	125	371	496	1,134
45–54	36	55	91	56	83	139	47	35	82	312
55–64	22	31	53	34	44	78	18	7	25	156
65 and older	40	22	62	20	38	58	5	3	8	128
N/A	48	22	70	30	45	75	23	26	49	194
Total	1,435	2,236	3,671	1,016	1,348	2,364	1,089	1,804	2,893	8,928

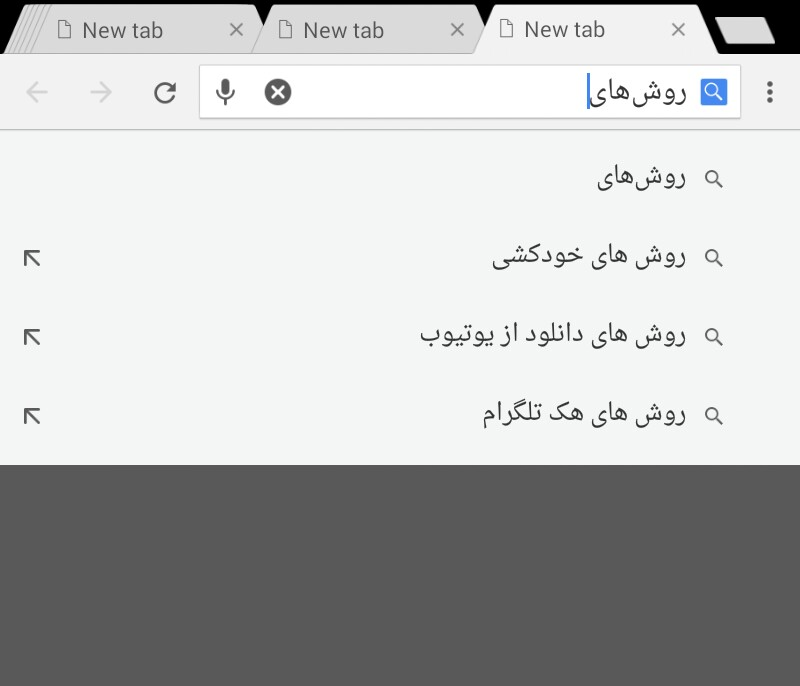
The first suggestion that the Google search suggestion shows by typing the phrase "methods of..." (روش‌های...) in Persian, is "methods of suicide" (روش‌های خودکشی). March 4, 2016.

=== Gender ===
==== Women ====
Iranian women are more vulnerable to suicide than other groups in the society. In 2007, Iran ranked the third country in which women were outnumbering men in committing suicide.

According to a study published in 2008, women's suicide rate in Iran was double that of men. This study also found that drug overdose is the most popular method of suicide among Iranians; hanging and self-immolation, respectively, are the most popular methods after drug overdose.

=== Age ===
==== Children and teenagers ====
Based on Iranian statistics, from 1984 to 1993, nearly 1,500 deaths attributed to suicide of 27,000 deaths among children and teenagers were recorded annually. Teens from 13 to 17 years of age committed most of these suicides and the suicide rate among boys was four times that of girls. The total number of suicides from 1994 to 2001, were 4,250 which showed a large increase from the last mentioned period of time. Jalili, by excluding the exceptional cases, (Note: One of these exceptional cases was the mass suicide of a group of students in Sistan and Baluchestan Province, which happened after their beloved teacher committed suicide.) found the total number of teen suicides from 1993 to 2001 to be approximately 3,225 cases; the suicide rate based on gender was 3.7 boys to 1 girl. The most chosen methods of suicide were, respectively, drug poisoning, hanging, jumping from a height, and, very rarely, firearms. Boys chose firearms, explosives, hanging, and suffocation, whereas girls mostly chose poisoning or drug overdose as a method to kill themselves. The most chosen methods of suicides among children were jumping from a height, poisoning, hanging, stabbing, and jumping under vehicles.

In September 2015, Fateme Daneshvar, the director of the social committee of the Islamic City Council of Tehran, declared that from 2002 to 2004, 6 children committed suicide in Tehran. This data is from the Loghman Hospital in Tehran and is for suicides by poisoning for ages 8 to 13. Sociologist Majid Mohammadi considers the following five reasons for Iranian child and teen suicide: 1- conflicts in sexual identity which increases suicide rates among LGBT youths; 2- neglected depression; 3- group pressure and being bullied at school; 4- copycatting the suicide of another person and public hanging of criminals; and 5- Forced marriage in some provinces.

In a field study done on 323 students (159 boys and 164 girls) between the ages of 14 and 17 in the city of Isfahan, which was published in 2001, the prevalence of major depressive disorder among teenagers was nearly 43.4% and suicidal ideation 32.7%. (Note: In this study, 15.2% were aged 14, 34.4% were 15, 28.5% were 16, and 22% were 17. The average age was 15.57.) It was revealed that 55.5% of girls and 30.8% of boys had been suffering from mild or severe depression. This study also showed that the highest frequency of suicide ideation (58.3%) was among teenagers who described their parents' behavior to be restrictive (less emotional and more controlling), while the lowest frequency of suicide ideation (11.6%) was among teenagers who described the behavior of their parents to be democratic (more emotional and less controlling). The prevalence of suicide ideation among girls was more than boys (37.7% vs 27.5%, respectively).

==== Youths ====
According to suicide statistics of 2013, which were the most recent until July 2015, 54% of all suicides in Iran were committed by people aged under 30.

A longitudinal study done on students from 2003 to 2008, showed that hanging was the most chosen method and wrist cutting was the least chosen method of suicide. According to this study, single male students aged 22 who were studying Humanities in the Islamic Azad University, had a higher incidence of suicide than any other group. It was found that most of these suicides were committed near the time of the exams and in holidays between semesters.

== Methods ==
Table 3: Statistics of methods of death by suicide in Tehran from 1964 to 1974. (Data from the Medical Jurisprudence Organization of Iran)
Year	Hanging	Shooting	Wrist slitting	Self-immolation	Jumping from a height	Poisoning	Electric shock	Drinking gasoline	Total
1974	12	8	1	–	1	–	–	1	23
1973	18	3	2	5	–	–	–	–	28
1972	20	8	6	1	–	1	–	–	36
1971	22	8	2	3	–	3	–	–	38
1970	16	14	–	2	–	–	–	–	32
1969	17	13	5	2	–	3	–	–	40
1968	12	10	5	–	3	–	1	–	31
1967	20	9	6	4	1	–	2	–	42
1966	21	12	2	2	3	1	–	–	41
1965	19	8	9	–	1	1	–	–	38
1964	13	15	1	–	1	–	–	–	30
Total	190	108	39	19	10	9	3	1	379

=== Poisoning ===
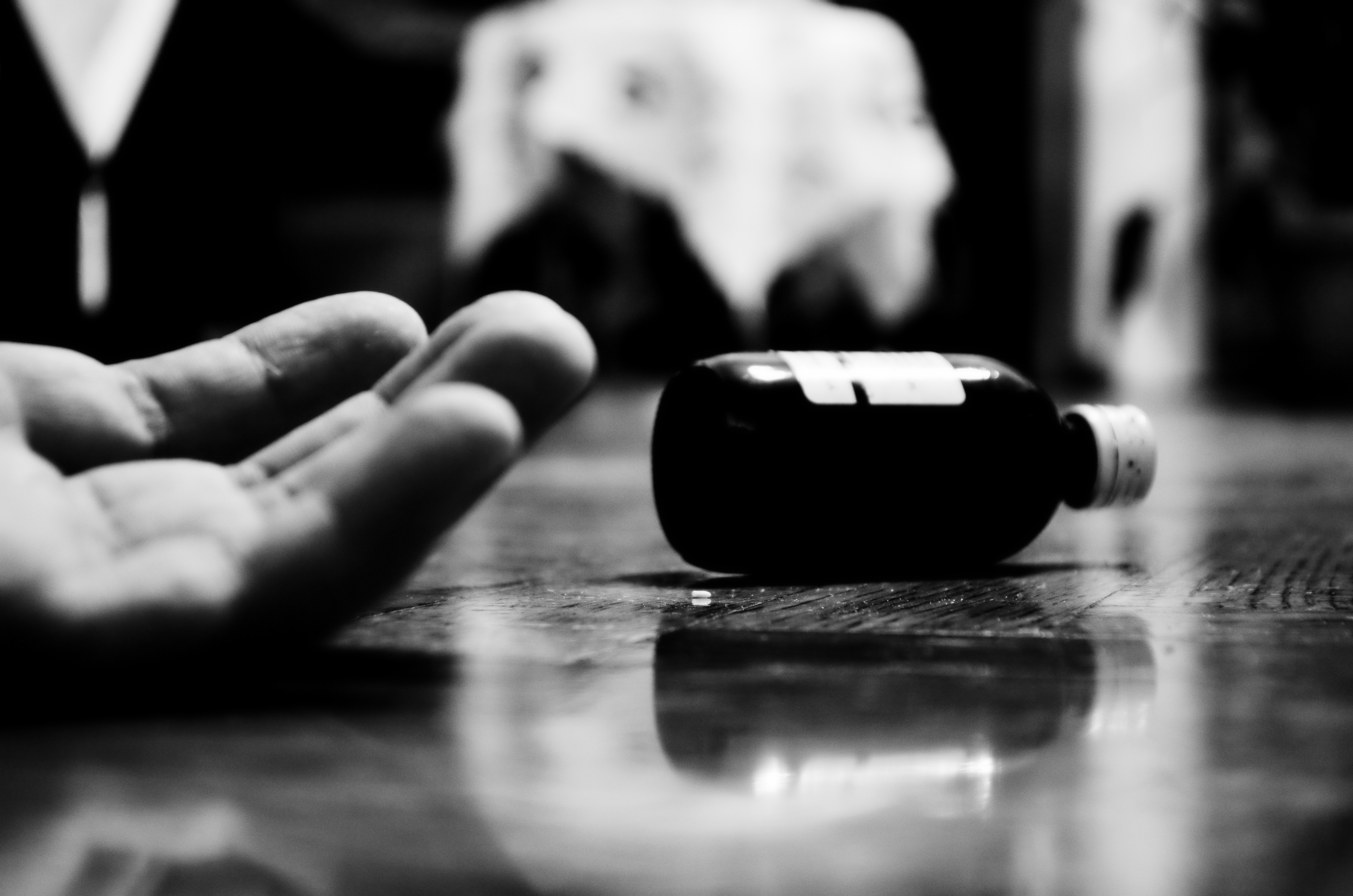
Drug overdose is the most common method of suicide in Iran. (Image is for illustration purpose only).

A 2006 study conducted by Ghoreyshi and Mousavi Nasab, showed that 55.8% of the population of 3,477 chose drug overdose as the most preferred method with a median of 55.8% of the total population.

In a meta-analysis study on other studies done until April 2012, Bidel and others found out that from all methods of poisoning, drug overdose with 75% and other poisons (including agricultural and domestic pesticides) with 13% had the most prevalence among suicides. According to this study, provinces of Golestan (90%), Markazi (89%), Razavi Khorasan (88%), and Hormozgan (88%) respectively, ranked the highest in suicide with drug overdose, and provinces of Ilam (25%), Bushehr (21%), and East Azerbaijan (20%) respectively, ranked the highest in suicide with other types of poisons. According to Bidel and others, the reason behind Ilam's high instances of suicide with agricultural pesticides is because such substances are easily accessible in this province.

=== Self-immolation ===
According to a 2001 report by the medical jurisprudence organization of Iran, self-immolation has been the most chosen method of suicide among women with 69.29% prevalence. This report also states that the highest rate of self-immolation as a method of suicide among men was from Yazd Province with 47% prevalence and the highest suicide rate with this method for women was recorded in Bushehr province with 94.4% prevalence.

In a meta-analysis study consisted of 19 studies with a population of 22,498 suicide cases until 2012, Nazarzade and others have concluded that generally speaking, from all physical methods of suicide, self-immolation, with a prevalence of 13%, is the most chosen method of suicide in Iran. They also found that the provinces of Kohgiluyeh and Boyer-Ahmad (48%), Ilam (28%), and South Khorasan (10%), respectively, ranked the highest rates for self-immolation as a method of killing oneself. According to Nazarzade and others, although suicide by this method in Iran occurs less than in other countries like India (40%), Sri Lanka (24%), and Egypt (17%), the prevalence of this method in Iran is more than some African countries like Zimbabwe (11%) and South Africa and also some European countries like Germany. Their report states that in general and except for poisoning, Iranian men and women tend to use violent methods like self-immolation, hanging, and shooting with firearms for their suicide. The prevalence of these types of methods is higher in western and south-eastern provinces of the country.

=== Hanging ===
Table 4: The frequency of methods of death by suicide referred to the Medical Jurisprudence Organization of Iran in the first half of 2004.
Method	Numbers	Per cent
Hanging	118	45.4
Drug overdose	42	16.2
Self-immolation	41	15.8
Jumping	18	6.9
Agricultural pesticides	7	2.7
Melee weapon	6	2.3
Firearm	5	1.9
Aluminium phosphide	5	1.9
Heroin injection	5	1.9
Carbon monoxide	2	0.8
Burning substances	2	0.8
Detergents	2	0.8
Plastic bag	2	0.8
Cyanide poisoning	2	0.8
Collision with train	1	0.4
Drowning	1	0.4
Total	260	100

Based on a 2001 report from the Medical Jurisprudence Organization of Iran, hanging, with the prevalence of 56.5%, was the most important method of suicide among men.

According to Nazarzade and others, based on a meta-analytical study of other studies conducted during the 1990s and 2000s, (excluding the studies that solely covered fatal suicide attempts), with a population of 22,468 cases of attempted suicides, the prevalence of hanging was only 2%. Based on this study, Kermanshah Province, in 2005 had the highest rate of hanging (17%), while Golestan Province, in 2002, had the lowest rate of hanging (1%). Also, suicide by hanging in Iran occurs less than in western and Asian countries.

The table on the right, shows the frequency of methods used in fatal suicide attempts that were referred to the Medical Jurisprudence Organization of Iran in the first half of 2004. According to this data, the most chosen method of suicide among both men and women in Iran was hanging. (Population= 180 men and 80 women). Among Iranian men who committed suicide, hanging (57%) and poisoning (17%) respectively were the most chosen methods, while for women, poisoning and self-immolation were the most chosen ones, both having nearly the same prevalence.

=== Firearms ===
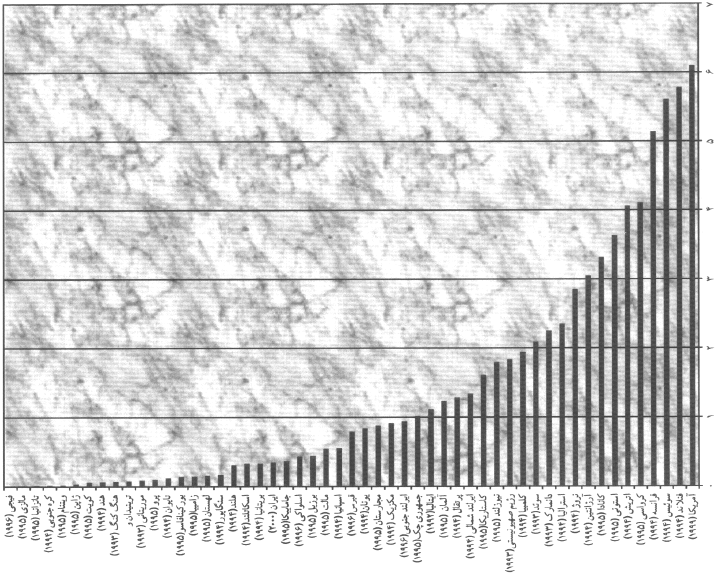
The diagram of prevalence of suicide by firearms in Iran in comparison with other countries whose statistics were available (per 100,000 people)

According to Khademi and others, due to limitations of accessing and using firearms in Iran, suicide by this method, in comparison with other methods such as poisoning, self-immolation, and hanging is less favorable.

Based on the data available from the Medical Jurisprudence Organization of Iran, in 2001, 8% of suicide fatalities involved a type of firearm (269 persons), and in total, the prevalence of this method was 0.42 in every 100,000 people. In the same year, men's suicide rate with this method was 91.4%, whereas with women, it was only 8.6%. Notably, 62% of suicides by shooting occurred in military locations. According to Khademi and others, the subject of suicide by firearms among conscripted soldiers in Iran is problematic and needs to be paid special attention.

Based on statistics from 2001, the provinces of Kermanshah, Ilam, and Lorestan, with 1.71, 1.67, and 1.63 suicides by firearm in every 100,000 people respectively, ranked the highest, and the provinces of Qom, Zanjan, and Mazandaran, with 0, 0, and 0.07 suicides by firearm in every 100,000 people respectively, ranked the lowest. Khademi and others attribute the high level of suicide by shooting in western and eastern provinces to arms trafficking and to the fact that in those provinces, people have easier access to weapons and tools used lethally than those in other provinces.

== Sites ==
=== Tehran Metro ===
In Iran, like other countries, suicide by train occurs. According to authorities, on average, each month one person kills themself by jumping on Tehran's subway railway. For example, on 15 May 2015, a 35-year-old man was injured and brought to hospital after throwing himself under a subway train at Moniriyeh Station. On 16 January 2016, a young lady committed suicide in Darvazeh Dolat Station.

=== Milad Tower ===
Before the 1979 Revolution of Iran, places like "Pelasko Building" and "The Aluminum Building" in Tehran were among the most common sites of suicide by jumping, and it has been said that some famous Iranian people like Sadeq Hedayat and Nosrat Rahmani intended to jump from these buildings. After the revolution, the Milad Tower, which had become the tallest building in Iran, attracted those who wanted to kill themselves by jumping. At least three suicides by jumping from the roof of Milad Tower have been reported.

== Dimensions ==
=== Legislative ===
The act of suicide has not been criminalized in the penal law of the Islamic Republic of Iran. However, no one is permitted to ask another to kill them. In addition, threatening to kill oneself is not an offense under the law, however, if this act of threatening is made by a prisoner inside a prison, then that would be considered a violation of prison regulations and the offender may be punished according to penal law.

According to the Act. 836 of the civil law of the Islamic Republic of Iran, if a suicidal person prepares for suicide and writes a testament, if he/she dies, then by law the will is considered void and if he/she doesn't die, then the will is officially accepted and can be carried out.

According to the theory of "borrowed crime", because suicide itself is not a crime in penal law, thus any type of assisting in an individual's suicide is not considered a crime and the assistant is not punishable. Assisting a suicide is considered a crime only when it becomes the "cause" of the suicidal person's death; for example, when someone takes advantage of someone else's unawareness or simplicity and convinces him/her to kill him/herself. In such cases assisting a suicide is treated as murder and the offender is punished accordingly. In addition, assisting a suicide is considered a crime under section 2 of Act. 15 of the cyber crimes law of the Islamic Republic of Iran which was legislated on June 15, 2009. According to the act, any type of encouragement, stimulation, invitation, simplification of access to lethal substances, and/or methods and teaching of suicide with the help of computer or any other media network is considered assisting in suicide, and thus, is punished by imprisonment from 91 days up to 1 year or fines from 5 to 20 million Iranian rials or both.

=== Religious ===
In Iran it's said by the religious figures that according to the Islamic texts, suicide is a sin, because it would be unthankful of the blessings that God (Allah) has given them.

=== Cultural ===
While suicide is portrayed and discussed in many Iranian classic art works and literature, speaking of it among people is seen as more or less of a taboo. The cases of suicide among people are thought of with both sympathy for the victim and a sense of disdain or shame for the family and close friends of the person.

=== Artistic ===
Sadegh Hedayat, a famous contemporary Iranian writer, has used suicide as a theme in some of his stories such as "Buried alive", "Parvin, daughter of Sasan", and "Darkroom". In the short story, "Buried alive", the narrator of the story wants to be far from mankind. He has found life to be a waste, doesn't have any hope to continue, and is constantly in search of suicide methods. For him, death is the means of achieving calmness. In the play, "Parvin, daughter of Sasan", Parvin is in love with Parviz who is fighting Arabs to stop them from conquering Ray. Finally, Parviz is killed, and Parvin, who is interested by an Arab General, kills herself hopelessly. In the short story "Darkroom", the narrator follow-travels with a strange person who does not want to communicate with people and share in their pleasures; instead, he wants to come back to his mother's uterus. At the end of the story, the narrator finds the strange person's dead body in his oval-shaped jujube-colored room with his feet retracted to his stomach, resembling a fetus.

The Taste of Cherry, a 1997 movie by Abbas Kiarostami that won the Palme d'Or of Cannes Film Festival, is about a man named "Badi'ei" who has the intention to kill himself by overdosing and is searching for someone to pour soil on his dead body after his suicide.

== Comparison ==
In a 2005 comparative field study between 156 Iranian students with an average age of 16.5 and 167 Swedish students with an average age of 17, it was revealed that Swedish students, in comparison with their Iranian counterparts, had more liberal views towards suicide and considered it a right for any person. Whereas the Iranian students believed that no person is allowed to kill themself and those who do, if they survive, should be punished. Also, Swedish students had a higher rate of acceptance for their friends who survived suicide than their Iranian counterparts. In addition, believing in life after death and the punishment of those who die due to suicide, was more common among the Iranian students than the Swedish students.

== Examples ==
=== Notable Iranians ===
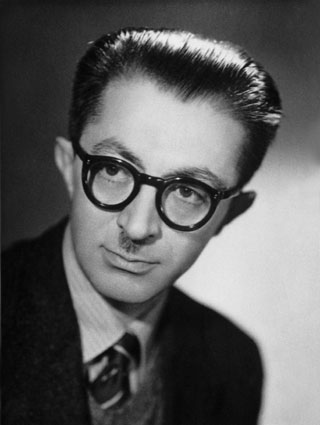
Sadegh Hedayat

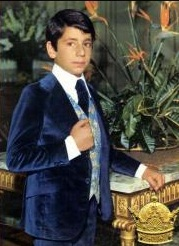
Ali-Reza Pahlavi

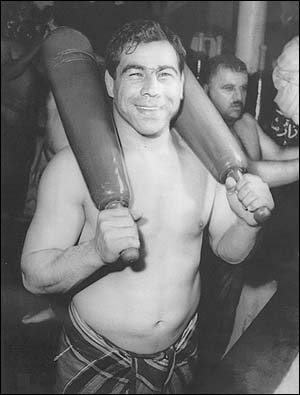
Gholamreza Takhti

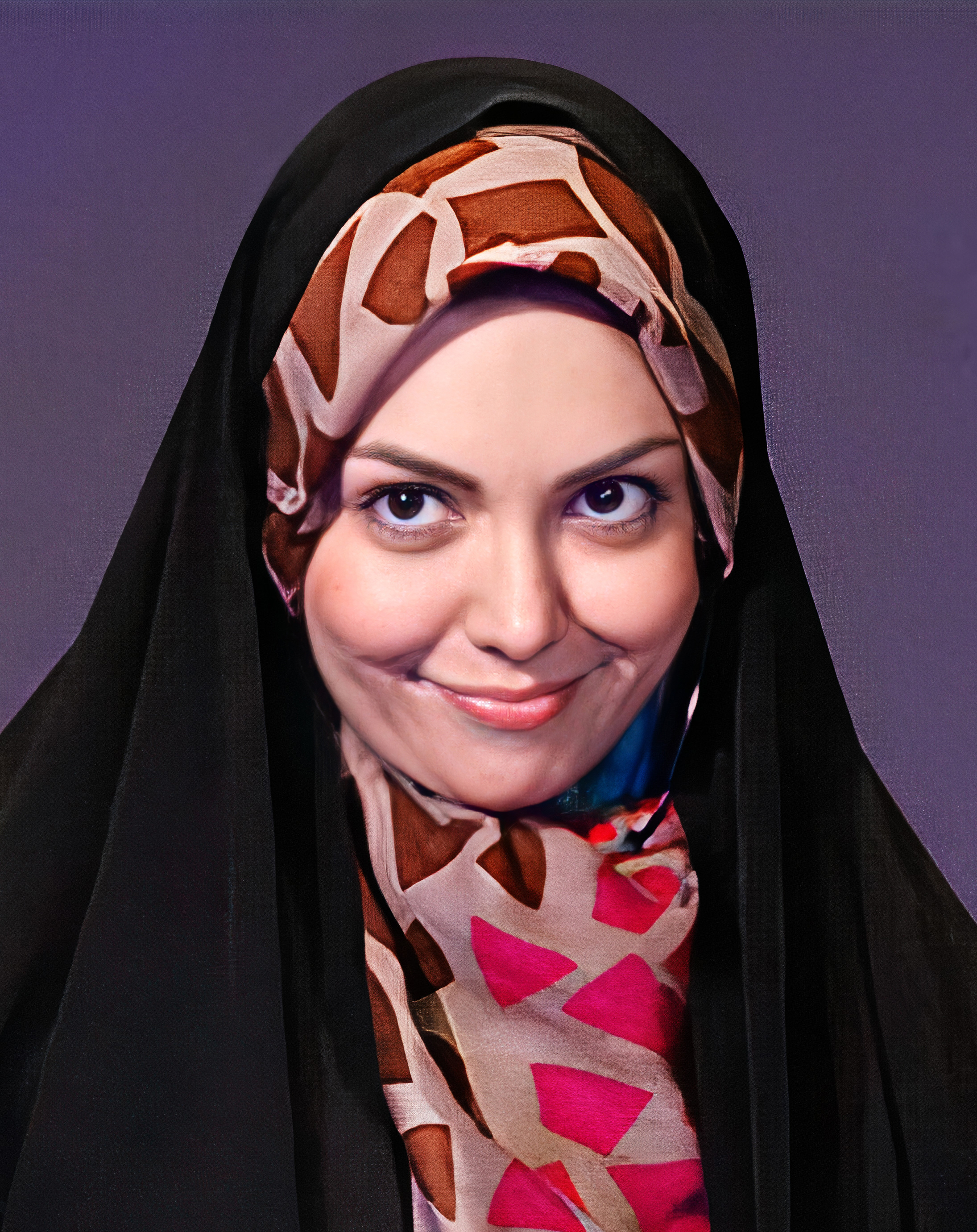
Azade Namdari

Name	Suicide Year	Causes and Explanations
Ghazaleh Alizadeh	1996	poet and writer. A sufferer of cancer, she committed suicide by hanging herself from a tree.
Younes Asakere	2015	an Iranian Arab citizen who committed self-immolation in front of the municipal building in Khorramshahr after his shop was confiscated by the municipality.
Homa Darabi	1994	pediatrician and psychiatrist. Her death was by self-immolation.
Ali-Akbar Davar	1937	founder of the modern judicial system in Iran. He apparently died by suicide.
Saeed Emami	1999	member of Ministry of Intelligence. It was claimed that he died after poisoning himself in prison.
Babak Ghorbani	2014	wrestler. In jail for murder, he committed suicide.
Neda Hassani	2003	a Canadian-Iranian protester who self-immolated on June 18, 2003, in front of the French embassy in London—dying a few days later.
Sadegh Hedayat	1951	writer, novelist, translator, and intellectual. He gassed himself in his apartment in Paris.
Shahrzad (Reza Kamal)	1937	dramatist and playwright. He committed suicide the same year as several friends' suicides in what is said to have been a suicide pact.
Mansour Khaksar	2010	poet, writer, and political activist. He ended his life voluntarily in Los Angeles.
Mohammad Khiabani	1920	Iranian Azerbaijani cleric, political leader, and representative to the parliament. The prime minister Hedayat claimed that Khiabani committed suicide.
Valiullah Faiz Mahdavi	2006	political prisoner. He died after a nine-day hunger strike. Government officials stated that he committed suicide.
Akbar Mohammadi	2006	university student. He died in prison due to a hunger strike.
Abbas Nalbandian	1987	playwright. After completing a prison sentence followed by a period of unemployment, he committed suicide.
Alireza Pahlavi	2011	younger son of the former Shah of Iran. He died in Boston from a self-inflicted gunshot wound after a long period of depression.
Leila Pahlavi	2001	youngest daughter of Mohammad Reza Pahlavi and Farah Pahlavi. Suffering from anorexia, bulimia, and depression, she overdosed with barbiturates in her London hotel room.
Hadi Pakzad	2016	composer, songwriter, and singer of alternative rock music.
Siamak Pourzand	2011	journalist and film critic. He jumped from the 6th-story balcony of his apartment.
Taqi Rafat	1920	Iranian-Azerbaijani poet, playwright, critic, and journalist. A follower of Mohammad Khiabani, Rafat committed suicide after Khiabani's movement was violently crushed.
Khurshid of Tabaristan	761	the last Dabuyid ispahbadh of Tabaristan. With the Abbasid conquest of Tabaristan and on learning of his family's capture, he took poison in Daylam
Gholamreza Takhti	1968	Olympic Gold Medalist wrestler. He was found dead in his hotel room in Tehran. The Iranian government officially called his death a suicide.
Mohammad Vali Khan Tonekaboni	1926	military commander and Prime Minister. Left a suicide note addressed to son.
Zahra Bani Yaghoub	2007	medical doctor. Iranian officials claimed that she hanged herself in prison in Hamadan.
Nasser Yeganeh	1993	Chief Justice of the Supreme Court. He committed suicide on his boat in the United States.
Azade Namdari	2021	Television producer and presenter. According to Mehr News Agency's "informed source", the cause of death was suicide.

== See also ==
- suicide crisis

== Cited texts ==
Books

- Azar, Mahyar; Noohi, Sima; Shafiei, Alireza (2010). Suicide. Arjmand. ISBN 978-964-496-034-5.
- Eslaminasab, Ali; Taghvaei, Zahra (1992). Suicide Crisis. Ferdows & Majid.
- Fooladi, Ezzatollah (2002). Strategies and Plans of Suicide Prevention with a Focus on Youth and Teenagers. Fajr-e Andisheh. ISBN 978-964-93963-3-0.
- Headley, L.A. (1983). Suicide in Asia and the Near East. University of California Press. ISBN 978-0-520-04811-9.
- Shneidman, E.S.; Leenaars, A.A. (1999). Lives and Deaths: Selections from the Works of Edwin S. Shneidman. Series in death, dying, and bereavement. Brunner/Mazel. ISBN 978-1-58391-011-5.

Journals

- Anbari, Musa; Bahrami, Ardashir (Summer 2010). "A review on effects of poverty and violence on suicide rates of Iran". Social Issues of Iran (in Persian). 1 (2): 1–29. ISSN 2008-8973 – via Magiran. (subscription required)
- Jalili, Behrooz. "Suicide the most urgent, Kids' psychiatry emergency". SID.ir (in Persian).
- Shirzad, Jalal; Gharrahdaghi, Jaber. "Review of methods and reasons of lethal suicides referred to the medical jurisprudence organization of Iran in the first half of 2004". SID.ir (in Persian).
- Zargham Boojeni, Ali; Yazdani, Mohsen; Yazdan-Nik, Ahmad-Reza (Summer 2001). "The relation between parents' behavior types and depression or suicide ideation amongst teenagers". The Medical Journal of Shahr-e Kord University (in Persian) (3): 46–54 – via Ensani.ir. (subscription required)
