= Azadistan (disambiguation) =

Azadistan was a short-lived state in the Iranian province of Azarbaijan in 1920.

Azadistan may also refer to:

- Azadistan, a fictional country in Mobile Suit Gundam 00
- Azadistan (magazine), a Persian-language magazine in 1920
