= Hamid Mammadzadeh =

- Həmid Məmmədzadə
- Born: 1924; Tabriz, Iran
- Died: 2000 (aged 75–76); Tehran, Iran
- Occupations: Writer, literary criticism
- Writing career
- Language: Azerbaijani
- Years active: 1946–2000

Hamid Mammadzadeh (Azerbaijani: Həmid Məmmədzadə; 1924–2000) – Azerbaijani writer, literary critic.

He was a teacher during the National Government of Azerbaijan. He was a member of the Democratic Youth Organization of Azerbaijan. He appeared in the media with his articles and stories. In 1946, he was awarded the "21 Azer" Medal by the National Government of Azerbaijan for his participation in the national-democratic movement.

After the fall of the National Government of Azerbaijan, he moved to Baku. He was a member of the Union of Writers of Azerbaijan, the head of the department of scientific funds at the Museum of Azerbaijani Literature named after Nizami, and a senior researcher at the department of Iranian philology at the Institute of Near and Middle Eastern Peoples.

== Life ==
Hamid Reza oglu Mammadzadeh was born in 1924 in Ahrab neighborhood in Tabriz. He received his first education at "Najat" and "Parvarish" schools in Tabriz. After finishing school in 1942, he studied at the Darul-mu'alim located in Tabriz. After graduating from this school, he worked as a teacher at the Safavi, Purandukht and Sanan schools of Ardabil for two years.

He joined the Tudeh Party in 1943, and the Azerbaijani Democratic Party in 1945. After the establishment of the National Government of Azerbaijan, he returned to Tabriz and taught there. He headed the Propaganda Department of the Central Committee of the newly formed Azerbaijan Democratic Youth Organization. His first articles were published in 1946 in "Javanlar" newspaper and "Azad Millat" newspaper, the organ of the Azerbaijan Democratic Youth organization, and his first stories were published in "Pioner" and "Azerbaijan" magazines. Later, he entered the history and literature department of Tabriz University to continue his education. In 1946, he was awarded the "21 Azer" Medal by the National Government of Azerbaijan for his participation in the national-democratic movement.

After the collapse of the National Government of Azerbaijan in 1946, Hamid Mammadzade moved to Baku. Here, he continued his studies at the Higher Party School of Azerbaijan and at the same time at the Faculty of Journalism of the Azerbaijan State University. After graduating from high school, he entered the post-graduate course of the Institute of Language and Literature named after Nasimi of the Azerbaijan Academy of Sciences. In 1951–1954 he was awarded the degree of candidate of philological sciences by writing a scientific work on "Revolutionary, journalist, writer Peshawar (life, environment, creativity)". Later, in 1968, while working as a senior researcher at the institute, he defended his doctoral thesis on "Akhundov and the East". Later, he worked as the head of the scientific funds department at the Nizami Museum of Azerbaijani Literature, and as a senior researcher at the Iranian philology department of the Institute of Near and Middle Eastern Peoples. Since 1947, he has been a member of the South Azerbaijan Writers' Society, and since 1958, the Azerbaijan Writers' Union.

Hamid Mammadzade collected and published documents and findings related to the literary works of Mirza Fatali Akhundov, Alishir Navai, Hafiz Shirazi, Mahammadhuseyn Shahriyar, Mirza Agha Tabrizi, Mirza Shafi Vazeh and others during his activity in Baku. There are works such as "Mirza Fatali Akhundov and the East", "Iranian literature on the eve and during the Mashruta revolution", "Bahar Shirvani", Seyyed Jafar Peshavari", "Memories of Tabriz", "Fadai" story, "Northern stories", "Stolen monument", "Tabriz smile", "Longing for freedom", "South Azerbaijani literature in 1941–45", "Motherland and Patriotism motifs in Southern poetry in the post-revolution period", "Molla Nasred's journal in Tabriz", "About the South Azerbaijani poet Sahand", "Sadiq Bey" Sadighi Afshar", "Hymnist of the National Liberation Movement", "Abbas Panahi (Makulu)", Mohammadi Mudarrisi-Tabrizi", "Southern Folklore", "Azeroglu", "Sheikh Mohammad Khiyabani", "Zeinalabdin Maraghayi", "Hamid Nitqi". He wrote a novel about Sattar Khan and Heydar Amioglu. Nasimi's Persian divan, M. H. Shahriyar's poetic works in Turkish, Nizami Ganjavi's poem "Khosrov and Shirin", Jalil Mammadguluzadeh's stories, Zeynalabdin Maraghali's novel "Ibrahim Bey's Travelogue" were published with his translation and compilation. Books "Stories" in 1957, "Footballer" in 1961, "First Love" in 1966, "Memories of Tabriz" in 1978, "Stolen Monument" in 1984 were published in Baku.

After the Iranian Islamic Revolution in 1979, he first moved to Tabriz and then to Tehran. Here, his stories and literary-critical articles are regularly published in the Turkish-language press. For a long time, he cooperated with the "Varlig" magazine published in the Azerbaijani language, and was one of the founders of the literary, socio-political magazine "Yol". He died in 2000 in Tehran.

== Awards ==
- — In 1946, he was awarded the "21 Azer" medal by the National Government of Azerbaijan for his participation in the national-democratic movement.

== See also ==
- Ismayil Jafarpour
