= Saher =

Saher is a both a family name and a unisex given name. Notable people with this name include:

- Charlene von Saher (born 1974), British figure skater
- Habib Saher (1903–1988), Iranian poet
- Saher Thioune (born 1989), Senegalese football player
- Saher Alghorra, Palestinian photojournalist
- Saher Al-Suraihi (born 1998), Saudi Arabian football player
- Saher Galt - musician in duo Galt Aureus
