= Sems Kesmai =

Iranian poet

- شمس کسمایی
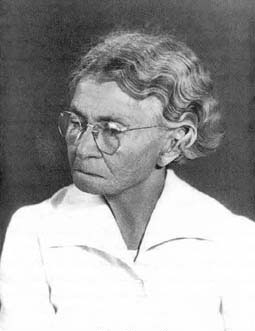
- Born: March 4, 1884; Yazd, Iran
- Died: November 3, 1961 (aged 77); Tehran, Iran
- Occupation: Poet
- Writing career
- Literary movement: Modernism

Sems Kesmai (March 4, 1884 – November 3, 1961; Persian: شمس کسمایی) was an Iranian poet known for her innovations in Persian modernist poetry.

== Biography ==
Sems Kesmai was born 1884 in Yazd, Iran. Her father was an immigrant from Georgia, and her family was broadly from Iran's nearby Gilan region.

She pursued some studies in her hometown, but she was married off to a tea merchant, Hossein Arbabzadeh, at a young age and did not resume her education until she was 27 years old and living with him in Ashgabat, Turkmenistan. There, she studied Russian and became familiar with the activism of the period. When she was 35 years old, her husband became bankrupt, and they moved to Tabriz in Iranian Azerbaijan. There, she started writing for activist newspapers—particularly Tajaddod—arguing against British intervention in Iran. She also began to publish poetry in modernist magazines and women's rights publications, including the magazine Azadistan.

Kesmai is considered the first female Persian modernist poet, described as "the mother of modern Persian poetry." She and her modernist peers saw moving away from the "rhetorical acrobatics" of traditional Persian poetry as the only way to save poetry's essence, rejecting Arabic prosody. Her writing often incorporated unexpected vocabulary, including Russian and Turkish words. Her poetry also sometimes included elements of Iranian nationalism.

In addition to poetry, Kesmai also wrote on feminist subjects, including opposition to veiling for women. However, after her son died in fighting during the Jungle Movement rebellion, and Mohammad Khiabani's uprising in Tabriz was crushed, she began focusing on pure poetry rather than activist writing.

Eventually, at age 57, she returned to her hometown of Yazd, before spending her final years in Tehran. She died there in 1961. Despite her important early role in Persian modernist poetry, relatively few of Kesmai's poems survive to the present day.
