= Ismail Amirkhizi =

Iranian author and constitutional intellectual

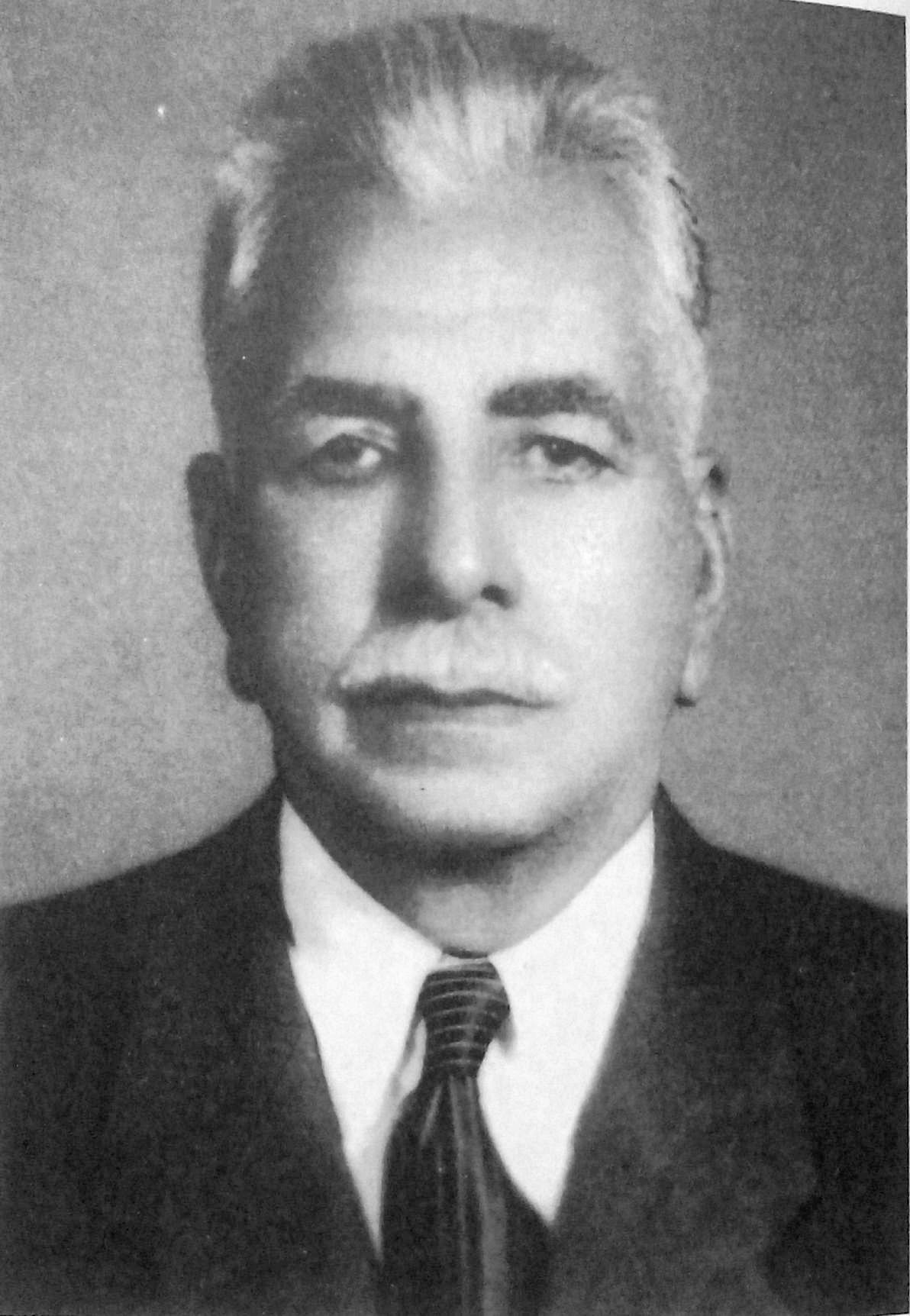
- Born: Mohammad Ismail Amirkhizi; 1873; Sufian District, East Azerbaijan province, Sublime State of Iran
- Died: 16 February 1966 (aged 92–93); Tehran, Imperial State of Iran
- Other names: nicknamed "Honar", "Gerami"
- Occupations: Author; Poet; Researcher; member of Persian Constitutional Revolution
- Parent: Mohammad Taghi
- Relatives: brother of Ali Amirkhizi

Ismail Amirkhizi or Mohammad Ismail Amirkhizi (Persian: اسماعیل امیرخیزی; 1873 – 16 February 1966) was an Iranian author, poet, researcher and one of the politicians and intellectuals of the Persian Constitutional Revolution. He was the brother of Ali Amirkhizi, a constitutional revolutionary, writer and political activist, member of the Central Committee of the Tudeh Party of Iran.

== Life and careers ==
Ismail Amirkhizi was born in 1873 in "Arvanagh region", Sufian District, East Azerbaijan province, Iran. Because he lived in Amirkhiz district, northwestern part of Tabriz, he became known as Amirkhizi. He learned the basics of Persian and Arabic literature in various schools, and at the age of fourteen he engaged in fabric business with his father, and then sought to complete his knowledge, so used the information of the great masters of the age. In his youth, he was considered one of the most famous writers in poetry and literature in Azerbaijan. In 1904, he went on Hajj pilgrimage. On his return, he became acquainted with the Constitution and the Republic for the first time in Istanbul through the press and talking to the people.

From the beginning of the constitutional movement, he joined the group of freedom fighters and participated in the Azerbaijan Provincial Association as the representative of the city of Ardabil. After a contention broke out between the Provincial Association and Mohammad Ali Shah Qajar, the Provincial Association appointed him as Sattar Khan's secretary, ostensibly, and his advisor, inwardly. He was an effective factor in Sattar Khan's office and Sattar Khan consulted with him in most matters.

After the inauguration of the second term of the National Consultative Assembly, Amirkhizi came to Tehran with Sattar Khan, but after the Atabak Park Incident, which resulted in Sattar Khan being shot and injured, he returned to Tabriz with Sattar Khan's permission. In 1912, as a result of the Russian occupation of Tabriz and the pressure of the supporters of tyranny, he emigrated to Istanbul, and from there he went to Berlin at the invitation of Hassan Taqizadeh and worked in the Committee of Iranian Nationalists. Amirkhizi left for Baghdad in 1915 to help the destinations of Nationalists, and after the fall of Baghdad to the British forces, he returned to Istanbul and stayed there for two years. When the Russians left Azerbaijan, Amirkhizi finally returned to Tabriz after 7 years away from home. In 1920, he joined the Ministry of Education and taught at "Mahmoudieh" High School in Tabriz.

During the Mohammad Khiabani's uprising in 1920, Amirkhizi joined the uprising and became a member of the "uprising board of directors" at Mohammad Khiabani's suggestion. He was the one who suggested that the name of Azerbaijan be changed to Azadistan. Amirkhizi was one of Khiabani's supporters and advisers during the uprising (6 April 1920 to 14 September 1920).

After the suppression of the uprising and Khiabani's assassination, Amirkhizi suddenly withdrew from politics and turned to cultural affairs. Until 1934, he was in charge of running the "Mahmoudieh" High School in Tabriz. After that, he was transferred to Tehran and became the director of the Dar al-Fonun high school. In 1942, he returned to Tabriz and became the director of one of Azerbaijan culture centers, but twenty months later he was transferred to Tehran at his own request. In 1946, he was re-elected as the head of the Dar al-Fonun.

In 1947, Amirkhizi was elected as high Inspector of the Ministry of Culture and Islamic Guidance. He retired in July 1949.

Mehdi Bayani, Expert in Persian manuscripts (founder of the National Library of Iran and professor of University of Tehran), has mentioned Ismail Amirkhizi as one of the calligraphers of Nastaliq calligraphy and as one of the students of Mirhossein Khoshnevis (a famous calligrapher in Iran).

== Death ==
He died on 16 February 1966 in Tehran, Iran.

== Bibliography ==
Amirkhizi has left some works in the fields of literature and history:

- Persian: دیوان امیرخیزی, lit. 'Diwan of Amirkhizi', 1940–1960
- Persian: تصحیح بوستان سعدی, lit. 'The first printed version with correction of The Bustan of Saadi Shirazi', 1931
- Persian: قطعات منتخبه از نظم و نثر فارسی, lit. 'Selected pieces of Persian poetry and prose', 3 volumes, 1931
- Persian: تصحیح دیوان عنصری, lit. 'Correction and calligraphic of Diwan of Abul Qasim Hasan Unsuri Balkhi'
- Persian: قیام آذربایجان و ستارخان, lit. 'Uprising of Azerbaijan and Sattar Khan', 1960
- Persian: تاریخ فرهنگ و ادب آذربایجان, lit. 'History of culture and literature of Azerbaijan'

Amirkhizi's articles and poems have been published in various magazines. Some of Amirkhizi's writes published after his death.

- Persian: اشعار گمشده: دو قصیده از منوچهری دامغانی, lit. 'Lost Poems: Two poems by Manuchehri Damghani', article, 1945
- Persian: توقیعات کسری انوشیروان, lit. 'Anushirvan Kasra's signatures', article, 1955
- Persian: آذری طوسی, lit. 'Azari Tusi', article, 1964
- Persian: جلوس ولیعهد ناصرالدین میرزا در تبریز, lit. 'Descension of Crown Prince Nasser ol-Din Mirza in Tabriz', article, 1972
- Persian: یادداشت‌های امیرخیزی, lit. 'Amirkhizi notes', articles, 1972–1975
- Persian: نامه حاج میرزا آقاسی به میرزا تقی خان, lit. 'Haji Mirza Aqasi's letter to Mirza Taghi Khan', article, 1973
- Persian: خداحافظی و بازگشت امیر کبیر به ایران, lit. 'Goodbye and the return of Amir Kabir to Iran', article, 1973
- Persian: شورش و غوغای مردم ارزنة الروم, lit. 'Uprising and commotion of the people of Erzurum', article, 1973
- Persian: سفرنامه امیر خیزی و تقی زاده, lit. 'Travelogue of Amirkhizi and Taghizadeh', article, 1974
- Persian: سفرنامه تقی زاده و امیرخیزی, lit. 'Travelogue of Taghizadeh and Amirkhizi', article, 1974
- Persian: انفصال یا عزل کابینه ناصرالملک, lit. 'Separation or dismissal of Naser ol-Molk's cabinet', article, 1974
- Persian: غزل ارتجالی, lit. 'The offhand sonnet', article, 1975
- Persian: عدل مظفر, lit. 'Adle Muzaffar', article, 1975
- Persian: فتح آذربایجان, lit. 'Conquest of Azerbaijan', article, 1975
- Persian: چهره ی جهان در آینه ی شعر, lit. 'The face of the world in the mirror of poetry', article, 2003
- Persian: استاد محمّد نخجوانی؛ مقام رفیع, lit. 'Master Mohammad Nakhjavani; An eminent person', article, 2006

== See also ==
- Taqi Rafat
- Ali Reza Abbassi
- Mehdi Bayani
