= Zarifa Budagova =

Azerbaijani scholar (1929–1989)

- Born: Azerbaijani:Zərifə İsmayıl qızı Budaqova; 29 April 1929; Erivan, Soviet Union
- Died: 10 November 1989 (aged 60); Baku, Azerbaijan Soviet Socialist Republic
- Citizenship: Soviet Union
- Occupation: Philologist

Zarifa Ismayıl gizi Budagova (Azerbaijani:Zərifə İsmayıl qızı Budaqova; born 29 April 1929, Yerevan, Armenian SSR – died 10 November 1989, Baku, Azerbaijan Soviet Socialist Republic) was an Azerbaijani scholar, PhD of Sciences in Philology (1963), Professor (1968), Corresponding Member of the Azerbaijan National Academy of Sciences (1980), the first female scholar among Azerbaijani women to be awarded the title of Doctor of Philology Sciences, and the first female director of the Institute of Linguistics (1988–1989).

== Early life ==
Zarifa Budagova was born on April 28, 1929, in Yerevan. In 1943, she began her education at the Armenian SSR Pedagogical Technical School, and in 1945, she continued her studies at the Azerbaijan Language and Literature Faculty of the Armenian State Pedagogical Institute. In 1948, during the mass deportation of a significant portion of Azerbaijanis in Armenia, she and her family were also deported to Azerbaijan.

She was the spouse of the renowned scholar Budag Budagov. Zarifa Budagova died on November 10, 1989, in the city of Baku. She was buried in the II Alley of Honor

== Activity ==
In 1953, she completed her postgraduate studies at the Department of Turkic Languages at the Institute of Linguistics of the Soviet Academy of Sciences. Her research topic was "The category of verb aspect in the Azerbaijani language." In 1963, she defended her dissertation on the subject of "Simple Sentences in Azerbaijani Literary Language," earning the highest academic degree within the Soviet educational system. In 1968, she became a professor, and in 1980, she was elected a Corresponding Member of the Azerbaijan National Academy of Sciences (AMEA).

Zarifa Budagova was the first female scholar among Azerbaijani women to be awarded the title of Doctor of Philological Sciences, and she also served as the first female director of the Institute of Linguistics from 1988 to 1989. She authored more than 100 scientific works and 8 books. Additionally, Budagova mentored over 20 doctoral students during her career.

She worked at the Institute of Linguistics of Azerbaijan National Academy of Sciences from 1953 to 1989, and from 1955 to 1989, she was the head of the Modern Azerbaijani Language Department. In 1988 and 1989, she served as the director of the institute.
