= Jafarpour =

Jafarpour is a surname. Notable people with the surname include:

- Ismayil Jafarpour (1925-1977), Azerbaijani orientalist
- Mehdi Jafarpour (born 1984), Iranian footballer
