= 1876 in Iran =

- Decades
- See also: Other events of 1876; Years in Iran

The following lists events that happened during 1876 in Qajar era.

== Incumbents ==
- Monarch: Naser al-Din Shah Qajar

== Births ==
- January 2 – Ahmad Qavam, Prime Minister of Iran.
- April 7 – Agha Bozorg Tehrani, Iranian ayatollah.
- ? – Ismail Amirkhizi, Iranian calligrapher and writer.
- ? – Vahan Papazian, Armenian politician.
