= Mohammad Khiabani's uprising =

Liberal and democratic uprising in Iran, 1920

Date	April 5–14 September 1920
Location	Tabriz, Azerbaijan (Iran)
Result	Suppression and defeat of the uprising

Belligerents
Qajar Iran	Azadistan

Commanders and leaders
(Qajar Iran) Ahmad Shah Qajar (Qajar Iran) Vosugh od-Dowleh (Qajar Iran) Hassan Pirnia (Qajar Iran) Mehdi Qoli Hedayat	Mohammad Khiabani; Ismail Amirkhizi

The Mohammad Khiabani's uprising (Persian: قیام محمد خیابانی) was a liberal and democratic uprising that was started by Mohammad Khiabani against the central government in Iran on April 5, 1920 and was suppressed when he was killed on September 14, 1920.

== Background ==
The failure of the Persian Constitutional Revolution and its aftermath was like an earthquake, followed by aftershocks such as the Jungle Movement of Gilan, the Colonel Pesyan Uprising, and the Mohammad Khiabani's Uprising. The deterioration of the socio-political situation in Iran, the interventions of the Russian and British governments, the weakness of the central government and the formation of several local governments with short lifespans and mostly with dependent leaders were among the factors of the freedom-seeking uprising that sought to elevate the country. The ratification of the 1919 Anglo-Persian Agreement by Vosugh od-Dowleh and the killing of Russian forces in Tabriz and the Russian ultimatum to Iran in 1911, dealt a final blow to the supreme goals of the constitutional movement. Another factor that contributed to the uprising was the announcement of the dissolution of the Azerbaijani Democratic Party by Vossug ed-Dowleh. It was while despite his sabotage, six members of the party were able to enter the National Consultative Assembly.

== Targets ==
Mohammad Khiabani considered the Tabriz uprising as a continuation and salvation of the Constitutional Revolution, so he, referring to the failure of the Constitutional Revolution to achieve its goals, emphasized the need for a new movement. Mohammad Khiabani's uprising was based on a belief system and ideological movement that its target was the upliftment of Iran based on the principles of democracy, and there were fundamental differences between this uprising and armed uprisings such as the Jungle Movement of Gilan. He was well versed in the principles of sociology and was a scientist who knew the way to victory in the development of consciousness and intellectual revolution.

Considering that after the independence of the Caucasus and the change of its name to the Republic of Azerbaijan, and the unwillingness of the uprising to join them, Ismail Amirkhizi suggested that the uprising change the name of Iran's Azerbaijan to Azadistan, while the Azerbaijanis and the uprising, did not want to secede from Iran. Mohammad Khiabani said in one of his speeches:

We libertarians have a wish and a belief, we all say that true constitutionalism rules in the country, personal influences and privileges should be abolished and obsoleted, the sovereignty of the nation should be real - That is, to rely on and cite the sovereignty of the nation - We say should be justice, equality and freedom.

On the other hand, in some sources, such as Kasravi and Mojtahedi, they have described the Khiabani's targets as gross and suspicious, and have said that he longed for the government. But this was not evident in the Khiabani's behavior. Among the documents that are presented for the desire for autonomy in the Khiabani's behavior, at least at that time, are his telegrams to the Cabinet in Tehran in which he explicitly stated that he was not willing to accept anyone from Tehran as governor, but he wants a budget from Tehran. When Mokhber-ol Saltaneh Hedayat was sent as governor from Tehran, Khiabani refused to accept him and gave him an ultimatum, which resulted in Mokhber-ol Saltaneh recoursing to the military.

== Beginning ==
The uprising began on April 5, 1920, and was preceded by protests and speeches by some members of the Tabriz Committee of the Azerbaijani Democratic Party against the policies of the central government and the 1919 agreement. Following the Khiabani's lecture session in the "Tajaddod" building and even before that, a number of activists were arrested by the Nazmiyeh (law enforcement). Although Mozaffar Alam, the head of Nazmiyeh, tried to mediate, Nazmiyeh forces surrounded the party headquarters in the "Tajaddod" building, but as time went on, the gathering increased and on Wednesday, April 6, there were large demonstrations, when reaching a dead end in negotiations, with the threat of Khiabani, the forces of Nazmiyeh retreated and the Nazmiyeh administration was handed over to the Azerbaijani Democratic Party, and city officials were forced to leave Tabriz for Tehran on Thursday.

The statement was issued by Azerbaijani Democratic Party|the party on that Thursday:

The libertarians of Tabriz are excited by the reactionary tendencies that have manifested in a series of anti-constitutional actions by the local governments, and have risen up with the intention of protesting strongly and sedately. The libertarians of Tabriz declare that the whole point of their program is to obtain a total and complete assurance that government officials respect the free regime of the country and sincerely follow the constitutions. Liberals are determined to maintain order and comfort by whatever means are. The program of the libertarians is twofold: first, to establish public welfare, and second, to bring the constitutional regime to power.

== Organization ==
The uprising did not have a cohesive organization and the division of responsibilities was not clear, and it was mostly run individually and with the help of some members of the Democratic Party of Tabriz, such as Ismail Nobari and Mohammad Agha Hariri, and Khiabani himself. After the uprising began, a committee called the "Board of Directors of the Assemblies" formed and handed over government offices and appointed a supervisor for Nazmiyeh (law enforcement). Nazmiyeh and gendarmerie forces were handed over, but the Cossack Brigade was still under the command of the provincial ruler Abdol Majid Mirza, taking orders from him and Tehran. After the failure of Abdol Majid Mirza and his replacement with Mehdi Qoli Hedayat, the situation in the city had calmed down a bit, and the relative optimism of Khiabani about Mehdi Qoli Hedayat, prevented him to expansion of the popular resistance force that he had formed limitedly before.

At the same time, the "Board of Directors of the Assemblies" was able to hold a general assembly consisting of 480 people from Tabriz and the cities of the state and elect a state committee. The board also laid the foundation for the formation of the Central Gendarmerie with 500 people headed by Seyyed Hossein Yavar and tried to expand its military forces, but with the entry of Ottoman forces into Azerbaijan, the plan was prevented and the gendarmerie was closed.

== Suppression ==
Although Mehdi Qoli Hedayat had apparently accompanied the uprising upon his arrival in Tabriz, his main mission, as it turned out later, was to suppress the uprising, and even his predecessor Abdol Majid Mirza had not accepted this mission. On September 13, 1920, the Cossack forces and some gendarmerie agents, with the prior coordination and order of Mehdi Qoli Hedayat and under the command of Brigadier general Hashemi, attacked the building of the uprising headquarters. After a few hours, due to the lack of a proper defense force, the building was captured by the Cossack forces, so Khiabani hid in the house of one of his friends. The next day, the assailants were informed of the whereabouts and Khiabani was killed in a limited skirmish.

== Reasons for the failure ==
The main reason for the failure of the Khiabani's uprising was the weakness of this uprising in mobilizing the masses. He, who tried to raise awareness and enlighten the minds of the people with his speeches, neglected to equip and arm the masses, and the popular support was weakened for various reasons. Other causes of failure include the inability to control the Cossack force, the lack of sufficient financial resources, the lack of a stable force of armed fedayeen, the lack of a cohesive organization, making individual decisions, and the inability to unite political forces during the uprising.

== Speeches ==
Before and after the uprising, Khiabani regularly spoke at the "Tajaddod" building, the headquarters of the Democratic Party of Tabriz. His aim was to acquaint and remind the principles of freedom-seeking and the act of democracy in the constitutional movement. After the uprising began, sometimes up to 20,000 people in Tabriz participated in his speeches. His main effort in lectures was enlightenment and preparation of thoughts. Examples of his thoughts are evident in his numerous lectures:

- The uprising of Azerbaijan will ensure the freedom of Iran ...
- We want to provide the means of free and independent life and democracy in Iran ...
- We have risen up against the reactionary and authoritarian government and not against our century and time ...
- We want to establish a kind of democratic government in Iran that actually includes the sovereignty of the nation ...
- Because the government and the state are born of the nation, then according to reason and logic, the will of the nation should rule, not the theory of a few people ...

== See also ==
- Azadistan
