= Imadeddin Nasimi's statue =

Imadeddin Nasimi's statue- erected in Baku in 1980, commemorates the Azerbaijani poet who lived in the 14th and 15th centuries.

The statue was included in the list of nationally significant immovable historical and cultural monuments by Decision No. 132 of the Cabinet of Ministers of the Republic of Azerbaijan on August 2, 2001.

== About ==
In 1973, Azerbaijan celebrated the 600th anniversary of Imadeddin Nasimi's life at the state level. Scientific works and monographs about Nasimi were written during this period. Hasan Seyidbeyli directed the film "Nasimi," Fikret Amirov completed the ballet "Nasimi's Epic," Isa Muganna wrote the novel "Mehsher," and Qabil wrote the poem "Nasimi." Tokay Mammadov was commissioned to create Nasimi's statue. Due to the short time frame for completion, Tokay Mammadova collaborated with his colleague Ibrahim Zeynalov. Initially, a 69-centimeter model and a 2-meter mock-up of the statue were prepared. Subsequently, based on this mock-up, a 6.5-meter statue of Nasimi was created and installed in one of the central gardens of the city.

After Azerbaijan regained its independence, the statue was included in the list of nationally significant immovable historical and cultural monuments by Decision No. 132 of the Cabinet of Ministers of the Republic of Azerbaijan on August 2, 2001.
