= Azerbaijan naming controversy =

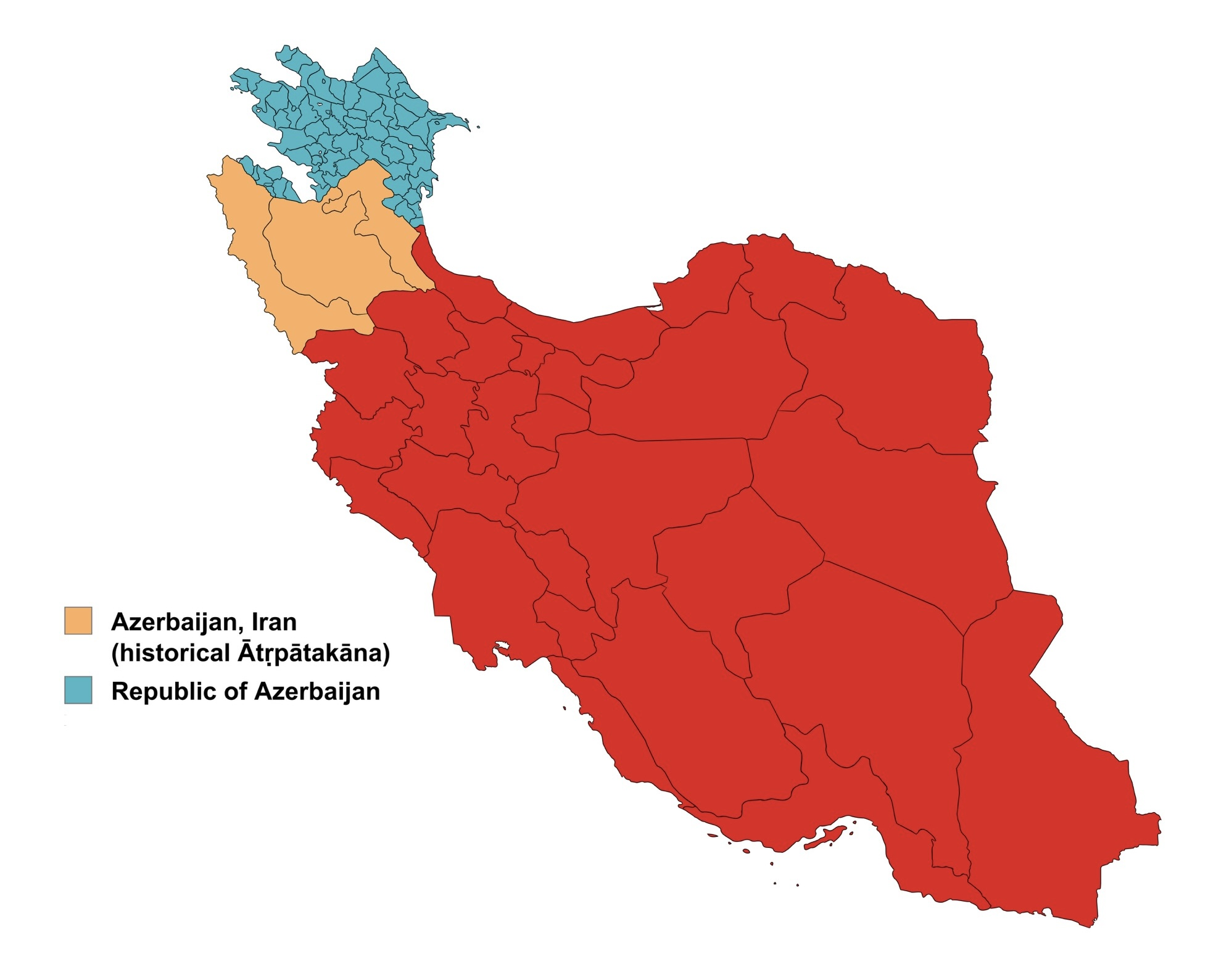
Map showing the region of Azerbaijan in Iran and the Republic of Azerbaijan in the South Caucasus

The toponym Azerbaijan has been the object of a naming controversy since 1918 between the region of Azerbaijan in Iran and the Republic of Azerbaijan in the South Caucasus. The toponym historically belongs to the former, i.e. the region of Azerbaijan in northwestern Iran, south of the Aras River, while historians and geographers usually referred to the region north of the Aras River as Arran, even though the name Azerbaijan had also sometimes been extended to this area as well. On May 28, 1918, following the collapse of the Russian Empire, the Azerbaijan Democratic Republic was proclaimed to the north of the Aras, triggering the controversy.

== Etymology and pre-Islamic evidence ==
The toponym Azerbaijan comes from Old Persian Ātṛpātakāna (known in Greek sources as Atropatene), the name of a kingdom founded by *Ātṛpāta (Atropates) and corresponding to the modern-day region of Azerbaijan in Iran.

The name of the region north of the Aras River known today as the Republic of Azerbaijan was previously an unrelated entity called Caucasian Albania by ancient Greek geographers and historians. For example, the Greek geographer Strabo (64 or 63 BC – c. AD 24) identifies Caucasian Albania as a territory distinct from Atropatene and describes it as "a land extending from the Caspian Sea to the Alazani River and the land of Mede Atropatene to the south".

Movses Kaghankatvatsi, the author of The History of the Country of Albania, which covers the period between the 4th and 10th centuries AD, describes the boundaries of Caucasian Albania as not going beyond the Aras River.

== Islamic period ==
In addition to the Greeks, numerous Muslim geographers and historians have provided information on the geographical boundaries of Arran and Azerbaijan. For instance, the 10th-century geographer Ibn Hawqal draws a map of Azerbaijan and Arran with the Aras River as the natural boundary between these two regions. Another geographer of the 10th century, Estakhri, identifies Arran and Azerbaijan as two separate regions. In his book Muʿjam al-Buldān (Dictionary of Countries), the 14th-century geographer and biographer Yaqut al-Hamawi clearly separates the geographical boundaries of Arran and Azerbaijan:

أَرَّانُ بالفتح وتشديد الراء وألف ونون اسم أعجمي لولاية واسعة وبلاد كثيرة منها جنزة وهي التي تسمّيها العامّة كَنْجَة وبَرْذَعة وشَمْكُور وبَيْلَقَانُ وبين أذربيجان وأرّان نهر يقال له الرس كلّما جاوَرَهُ من ناحية المغرب والشمال فهو من أرّان وما كان من جهة المشرق فهو من أذربيجان
Arran is an Iranian name belonging to a vast territory with many cities, among which are Janza – which is the same town that people refer to as Kanja [Ganja, Azerbaijan] – and Bardhaʿa, Shamkūr, and Baylaqān. Separating Azerbaijan and Arran is a river called ar-Rass [the Aras]. Everything located west and north of this river is part of Arran and everything that is east [and south] of it is part of Azerbaijan.

Also in the 14th century, the historian Abu'l-Fida specifies that Azerbaijan and Arran are two different regions. In his book Borhan-e Qati, Borhan Khalaf-e Tabrizi, an author of the 17th century, writes that "Aras is the name of a famous river" that "separates Arran from Azerbaijan".

=== Extension to the north of the Aras ===
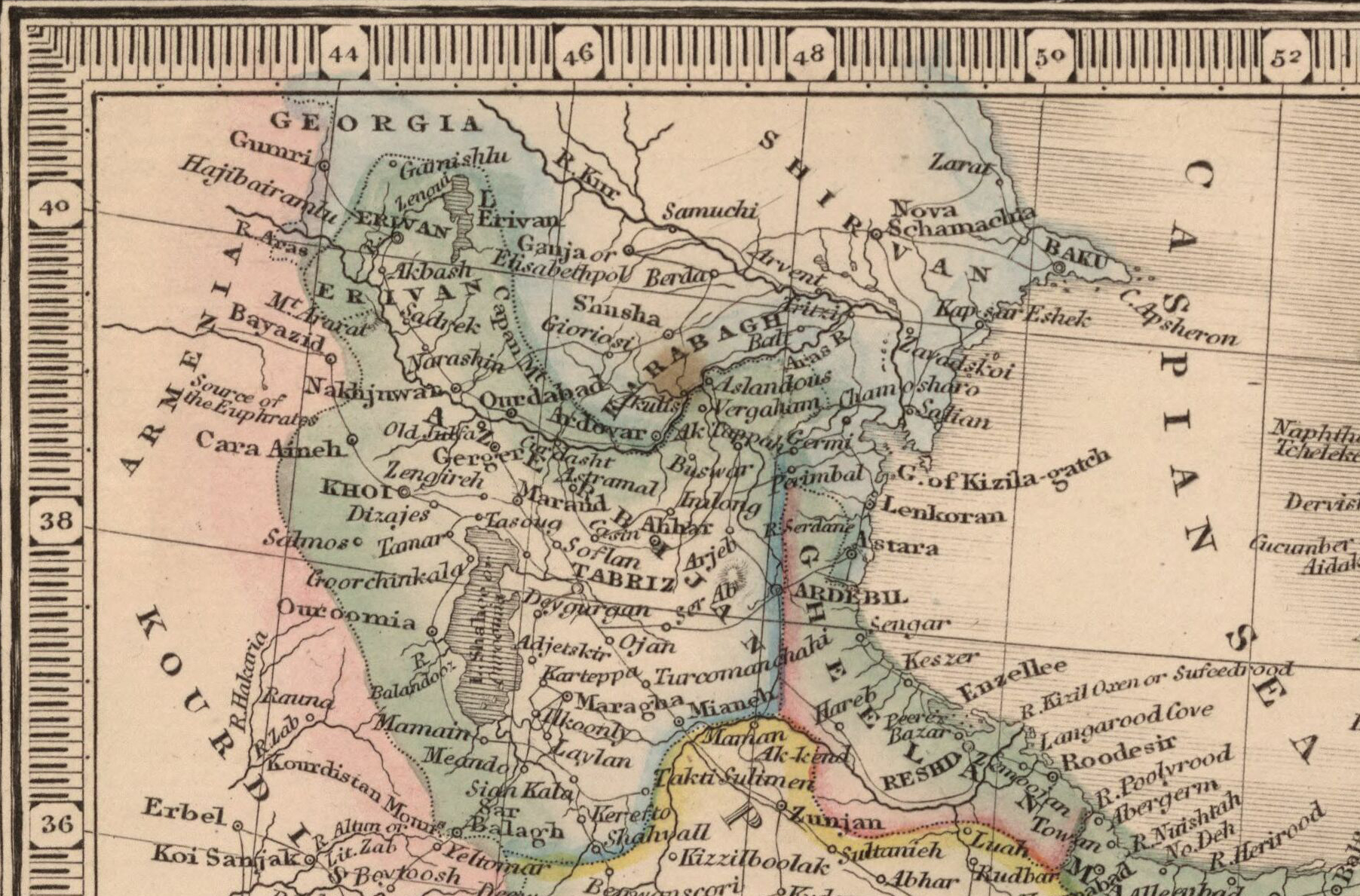
1864 map by James Wyld which extends Azerbaijan to the north of the Aras

In the accounts of the 13th-century scholar Yaqut al-Hamawi (which Xavier de Planhol refers to as "imprecise and sometimes contradictory information"), Azerbaijan stretched as far as Erzincan in the west. However, in other instances, Yaqut includes Arran and the Mughan plain as part of Azerbaijan, bringing its border up to the Kura River. This suggests that, starting around this time, the definition of Azerbaijan tended to be expanded to the north and that its meaning was swiftly changing. In Safavi times, the name Azerbaijan was applied to all the Muslim-ruled khanates of the eastern Caucasus, alongside the area south of the Aras River. Following the Russo-Persian War of 1826–1828, when the Russian Empire incorporated territory north of the Aras, Russian diplomat Alexander Griboyedov draw up "The Statute on the Governance of Azerbaijan" and "The General Rules for the Operation of the Azerbaijani Administration". Russian imperial generals like Pavel Tsitsianov and Dmitri Osten-Sacken have since used "Azerbaijan" for the territory north of the Aras.

== Founding of the Azerbaijan Democratic Republic in 1918 ==
Following the Russo-Iranian wars of the 19th century, and the consequent Treaty of Turkmenchay in 1828, the Aras River was set to be the boundary between Iran and Russia. As a result, the entire Caucasus was incorporated into the Russian Empire. Given the military weakness of Iran, the Turkish-speaking Muslims of the Caucasus, who were unhappy with Russia and had no hope of protection from Iran, turned to the Ottoman Empire. The Ottoman Empire who claimed to be the champion of the Muslim world increased its support for Muslims in the Caucasus. At the same time, in the late 19th century, ideas on Islamic unity and Turkish unity had gained popularity among Ottoman intellectuals. It resulted in the establishment of the Committee of Union and Progress in 1889 which called for the preservation of all peoples under the Ottoman Empire around the three pillars of Islam, Turkishness, and Caliphate.

In 1911, a group of Muslim Turkish-speaking intellectuals founded the Muslim Democratic Musavat Party, a small and secret underground organization to work for political unity among Muslims and Turkish-speaking peoples. Influenced by the Young Turks ideas, the leaders were sympathetic to Pan-Turkism. In October 1917, the people in Baku were still not interested in referring to the region in the south Caucasus as Azerbaijan. The local populace was frequently included under terms such as Türk milleti ("Turkish millet", lit. 'people, nation') and Qafqaziya müsalman xalqi ("the Muslim people of the Caucasus"). Even the name of the first Constituent Assembly, which was founded on 29 April 1917 in Baku, was "General Assembly of the Caucasian Muslims". On June 17, 1917, Musavat merged with the Party of Turkic Federalists, another national-democratic right-wing organization, and adopted a new name, Musavat Party of Turkic Federalists. At this time, the main goal of Musavat leaders was to create a united Muslim state under the protection of the Ottoman Empire. After the October Revolution in 1917, Musavat leaders, along with Georgian Mensheviks and Armenian Dashnaks, organized joint governance of the region and finally formed the short-lived Transcaucasian Democratic Federative Republic. With Georgia's declaration of independence, the federation collapsed. Thus, on May 28, 1918, Musavat leaders declared independence under the name of the Azerbaijan People's Republic.

Some scholars argue that the reason behind choosing the name Azerbaijan over Aran was because of the demands of the Turks (Ottomans who had a profound influence on Musavat leaders). Naming Aran as Azerbaijan could provide sufficient justification for the political unity of Turkish-speaking people of the South Caucasus and northwest Iran under the name of Azerbaijan. It could facilitate the process of Azerbaijan annexation to the Ottoman Empire (later Turkey).

The Azerbaijani politician Mahammad Amin Rasulzade noted that Azerbaijan was a new term for the region and that it had only been used after the Russian Revolution. In a number of seminars at Baku State University in November and December 1924, the distinguished Soviet orientalist Vasily Bartold talked about the purpose suggested by this designation; "however, the term Azerbaijan was chosen, because when the Azerbaijani republic was established, it was supposed that the Persian and this Azerbaijan would form one entity, since they have a very large similarity in the composition of their populations."

Prior to the Sovietization of the South Caucasus, its Turkish-speaking Muslim population were referred to as Tatars by Russian sources. Iranian sources labeled the people of the north of Aras by their location, such as Iravanis (of Iravan or Yerevan), Ganjavis (of Ganja), etc. The Soviets encouraged Azeri nationalists to create an "Azeri" alphabet, which supplanted the Arabo-Persian script, in order to create an Azerbaijani national history and identity based on the territorial concept of a nation and to lessen the influence of Iran and Islam. In the 1930s, the Soviet government ordered a number of Soviet historians, including the Russian orientalist Ilya Pavlovich Petrushevsky, to accept the completely uncorroborated idea that the former khanates' territory—with the exception of Yerevan, which had become Soviet Armenia—was a part of an Azerbaijani nation. Consequently, Azerbaijan and Azerbaijanis are used in Petrushevsky's two significant studies on the South Caucasus, which cover the period from the 16th to the 19th centuries.

== Reactions in Iran ==
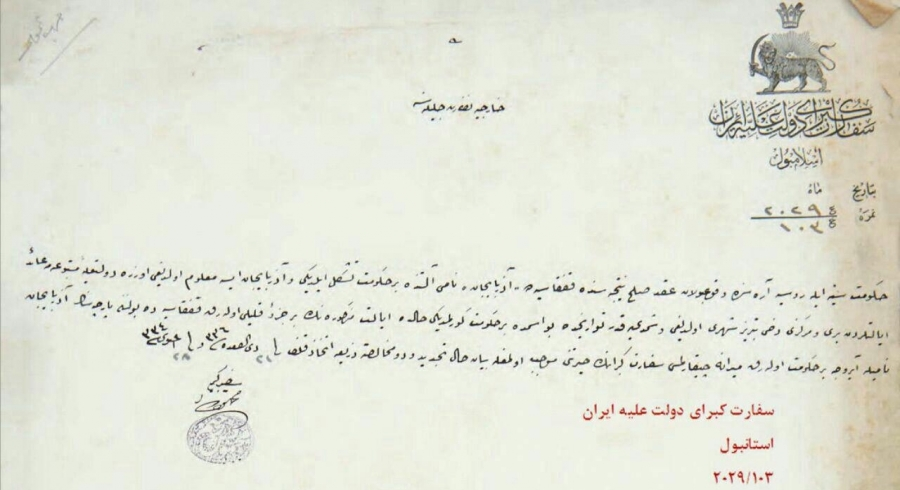
Letter of protest by the Iranian Embassy in Istanbul

Naming Aran as Azerbaijan caused surprise, confusion, and rage in Iran, especially among Iranian Azeri intellectuals. Mohammad Khiabani, an Iranian Azeri political activist and some other Iranian Azeri intellectuals recommended changing the name of Iranian Azerbaijan to Azadistan (the Land of freedom) to protest the name change. Ahmad Kasravi, an Iranian Azeri historian, was also surprised when he heard about the name change, although it seems that he was unaware of the motives behind choosing the name Azerbaijan. In his book, Forgotten Rulers, he wrote:

It is astonishing that Aran is named Azerbaijan now. Azerbaijan or Azerbaigan has always been the name of the territory that is bigger and more famous than its neighbor, Aran, and the two territories have always been distinct from each other. To this day, we have not been able to understand that why our brethren in Aran who strived for a free rule for their country would want to put aside the ancient and historical name of their country and transgresses towards Azerbaijan['s name]?

The decision to use the name Azerbaijan drew protests from Iran. According to Hamid Ahmadi:

Though the weak Iranian state was in a transitional period, struggling with foreign domination, the Iranian political and intellectual elites in Tehran and Tabriz, the capital of Iranian Azerbaijan, soon protested against such naming. For almost a year, the printed media in Tehran, Tabriz, and other big Iranian cities on the one side, and the media in Baku, the capital of the newly independent Republic of Azerbaijan, on the other side, presented their arguments to prove that such naming was wrong or right. Iranians were generally suspicious of Baku’s choice and regarded confiscating the historical name of Iran’s north-western province as a pan-Turkist conspiracy planned by the Ottoman Young Turks, then active in Baku, for their ultimate goal of establishing a pan-Turk entity (Turan) from Central Asia to Europe. By calling the real historical Azerbaijan located in Iran "southern Azerbaijan", the pan-Turkists could claim the necessity of unifying the Republic of Azerbaijan and "southern Azerbaijan" in their future "Turan". Fearing such threats, Shaikh Mohammad Khiabani, a popular member of the political elite in Iranian Azerbaijan and the leader of the Democratic Party (Ferqe-ye Demokrât), changed the name of the province to Azadistan (land of freedom). According to Ahmad Kasravi, Khiabani's deputy at the time, the main reason for such a change was to prevent any future claim by the pan-Turkist Ottomans to Iranian Azerbaijan on the basis of the similarity of the names.

According to Tadeusz Swietochowski:

Although the proclamation restricted its claim to the territory north of the Araz River, the use of the name Azerbaijan would soon bring objections from Iran. In Teheran, suspicions were aroused that the Republic of Azerbaijan served as an Ottoman device for detaching the Tabriz province from Iran. Likewise, the national revolutionary Jangali movement in Gilan, while welcoming the independence of every Muslim land as a "source of joy", asked in its newspaper if the choice of the name Azerbaijan implied the new republic's desire to join Iran. If so, they said, it should be stated clearly, otherwise, Iranians would be opposed to calling that republic Azerbaijan. Consequently, to allay Iranian fears, the Azerbaijani government would accommodatingly use the term Caucasian Azerbaijan in its documents for circulation abroad.

== "Southern Azerbaijan" and "Northern Azerbaijan" ==
"Southern Azerbaijan" is a Soviet-invented word, originally used to lay the Soviet Union's territorial claim on the Iranian historical region of Azerbaijan in line with a propaganda campaign to construct a national narrative. Though documents reveal that Moscow was behind instructing such propaganda work, there is also evidence of Soviet internal dissent to this policy, as Sergey Kavtaradze warned Vyacheslav Molotov that "renaming of Iranian Azerbaijan into Southern Azerbaijan ... would be inexpedient and fraught with the risk of unwanted consequences". The Soviets continued to promote this word even after demise of Ja'far Pishevari and the puppet state Azerbaijan People's Government.

After the dissolution of the Soviet Union, the "southern" theme was revived again. Utilization of the term has been an integral part of a nation-building attempt by the present-day Republic of Azerbaijan and its government. Official history thought at schools and universities tends to rediscover the separation of the nation when Russo-Persian Wars took place in the early 19th century, and a revisionist interpretation of events to show "constant struggle of the Azerbaijanis for their unity". As a result, usage of the term Iranian Azerbaijan would automatically adjust Republic of Azerbaijan to Iran and undermine justification for independence of the former, and is thus. Certain political circles in Baku welcome the so-called Southern Azerbaijan National Awakening Movement.

A number of politicians from the Republic of Azerbaijan have suggested renaming the latter as "Republic of Northern Azerbaijan".

== See also ==
- Falsification of history in Azerbaijan
- The Land of Fire
- Caucasian Albania
- Pan-Turkism
- Turanism
- Macedonia naming dispute, a similar case

== Sources ==
- Ahmadi, Hamid (2017). "The Clash of Nationalisms: Iranian response to Baku's irredentism". In Kamrava, Mehran (ed.). The Great Game in West Asia: Iran, Turkey and the South Caucasus. Oxford University Press. p. 108. ISBN 978-0190869663.
- Astourian, Stephan H. (2023). "Origins, Main Themes and Underlying Psychological Disposition of Azerbaijani Nationalism". In Dorfmann-Lazarev, Igor; Khatchadourian, Haroutioun (eds.). Monuments and Identities in the Caucasus Karabagh, Nakhichevan and Azerbaijan in Contemporary Geopolitical Conflict. Brill. pp. 206–236. ISBN 978-90-04-67738-8.
- Atabaki, Touraj (2001). "Recasting Oneself, Rejecting the Other: Pan-Turkism and Iranian Nationalism". In van Schendel, Willem; Zürcher, Erik J. (eds.). Identity Politics in Central Asia and the Muslim World: Nationalism, Ethnicity and Labour in the Twentieth Century. I.B. Tauris. pp. 65–84. ISBN 978-1860642616.
- Bournoutian, George (2016). The 1820 Russian Survey of the Khanate of Shirvan: A Primary Source on the Demography and Economy of an Iranian Province prior to its Annexation by Russia. Gibb Memorial Trust. ISBN 978-1909724808.
- Bournoutian, George (2018). Armenia and Imperial Decline: The Yerevan Province, 1900-1914. Routledge. p. xiv.
- Bournoutian, George (2021). From the Kur to the Aras: A Military History of Russia's Move into the South Caucasus and the First Russo-Iranian War, 1801–1813. Brill. ISBN 978-9004445154.
- Hunter, Shireen T. (1996). "Azerbaijan: searching for new neighbors". New States, New Politics: Building the Post-Soviet Nations. CUP Archive. ISBN 978-0-521-57101-2.
- Parvīn, N. (2011) [1987]. "ĀZĀDĪSTĀN". Encyclopædia Iranica. Vol. III, Fasc. 2.
- Swietochowski, Tadeusz (1995). Russia and Azerbaijan: A Borderland in Transition. New York: Columbia University Press.
