= Galt Aureus =

American rock duo

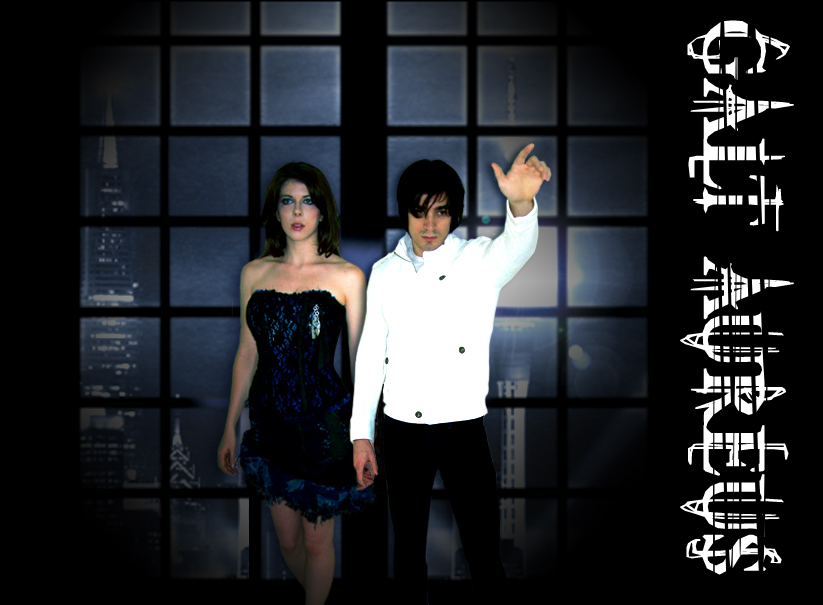

Background information
- Origin: Southern California, United States
- Genres: Rock, alternative rock, symphonic rock
- Years active: 2005–present
- Labels: Unsigned
- Members: Saher Galt: vocals, keyboard Susan Williams: vocals, guitar
- Website: www.galtmusic.com

Galt Aureus (pronounced galt AWR-ee-uhs) is an American rock duo formed in 2005. The group consists of Saher Galt (vocals, keyboard) and his partner Susan Williams (vocals, guitar). As an independent band, they have risen to prominence through a popular YouTube channel and word of mouth rather than through mainstream channels (major label distribution and mass media).

Galt Aureus' second full-length album, Citadels (released in 2009), reportedly reached the top ten on the Lala.com most listened albums chart and has received praise from music bloggers who note the album for its ambitious arrangements, often "layered", "complex" and orchestral in nature, and for having been recorded, mixed and mastered entirely by Galt Aureus. Galt Aureus' YouTube channel was amongst the top 100 subscribed channels of all time.

== Acknowledgments ==
Galt Aureus' animated music video The Armada was selected from over 23,000 entries by the Guggenheim museum curatorial staff to be among 125 videos on the YouTube Play "shortlist" - YouTube Play is a biennial showcase of creative online video.

The Queen of Blades by Galt Aureus was the first-place winner of the 2010 BlizzCon Song Contest, an annual contest put on by Blizzard Entertainment.

== Musical style and influences ==
Galt Aureus has been described as "powerful", "epic", "imaginative" alternative rock music by reviewers; stylistically, "they (Galt Aureus) fuse the best of many genres -- the clear precision of classicism, the passion of romanticism, and the intransigent heartbeart of the best of rock." The group cites the master composers (Beethoven, Chopin, Mahler, Prokofiev, Rachmaninoff) amongst their primary influences. In accounting for the apparent reference to classical music, particularly of the romantic era, Saher recalls, "I fell in love with Chopin and Beethoven very early on...what I do is informed much more by my favorite composers than any rock band." However, modern artists such as AFI, Bright Eyes, Opeth, The Mars Volta and The Smashing Pumpkins do appear on Galt Aureus' assorted social networking websites as influences. Galt Aureus has a distinctive lyrical style that is described as "grand", "elegant" and Saher points to the following authors as influential in his literary style: Ayn Rand, Oscar Wilde, Alexandre Dumas, père, Ernest Hemingway and William Faulkner.

== Discography ==
Treason (2014)

1. "Apparatus Emergit"
2. "Machine"
3. "Treason"
4. "Here Come the Crows "
5. "Asylum"
6. "Decay"
7. "Strike"
8. "Soliloquy of Slaves"
9. "Fractures in the Steel"
10. "Revive the Light"
11. "Unraveling"

Citadels (2009)

1. "Overture of Legion"
2. "The Cavalcade"
3. "At Dawn"
4. "Our Own Versailles"
5. "Citadels"
6. "The Armada"
7. "Spiral Stile"
8. "Eight"
9. "Before The Fall"
10. "Conquerors"
11. "Nocturne Carceris"

Heralds to the Sun (2006)

1. "Finis Coronat"
2. "The Glass of Fashion"
3. "All Lights Fade"
4. "Dark"
5. "A Secret Dies"
6. "The Errant Humble"
7. "Fall, The Legions"
8. "Six Ships"
9. "And We've Just Begun"
10. "Veneficus Ruinae"
11. "Silence"

Non-album tracks and other songs

- "Of War and Wisdom"
- "Fallen on the Front Lines"
- "I Want To Believe"
- "Coming Down"
- "This One"
- "For One Girl But All the World to See" (titled Eight on album Citadels).
- "From The Towers to the Ground"
- "Drop The Match"
- "You Don't Want To Find Out"
- "None of Us Are Safe"
- "Is There Anyone Left?"
- "My Lips Are Sealed"
- "The Haunted Mind"
- "The Beautiful Longing Words"
- "The Queen of Blades" (Blizzcon 2010 Original Song Contest Winner)
- "Shining Apollo"
- "Monolith"
- "Tourniquet"
- "Burn Down the Stage"
- "The Swarm"
- "Frozen in Code"

== Band members ==
- Saher: vocals, keyboard
- Susan: vocals, guitar
