= Imadaddin Nasimi =

Azerbaijani poet (c. 1369 – c. 1419)

Sayyid Nasimi
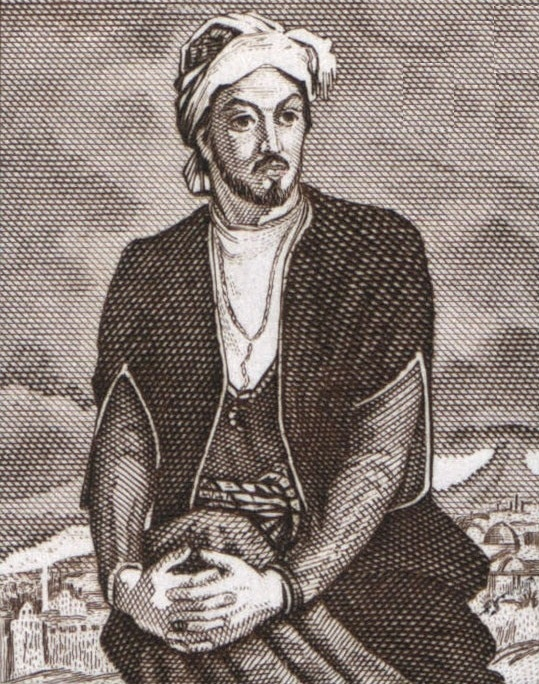
- Depiction by Mikayil Abdullayev, 1973
- Born: Ali Nasimi c. 1369/70
- Died: c. 1418/19; Aleppo, Mamluk Sultanate (now Syria)
- Occupation: Poet
- Writing career
- Language: Azerbaijani; Persian; Arabic

Seyid Ali Imadaddin Nasimi (Note: Also spelled as Nesimi.) (Azerbaijani: سئید علی عمادالدّین نسیمی, romanized: Seyid Əli İmadəddin Nəsimi; c. 1369/70 – c. 1418/19), commonly known as simply Nasimi (نسیمی, Nəsimi), was a 14th- and 15th-century Hurufi poet who composed poetry in his native Azerbaijani, as well as Persian and Arabic languages. He is regarded as one of the greatest Turkic poets of his time and one of the most prominent figures in Azerbaijani literature.

Born around 1369–70, Nasimi received a good education and was drawn to Sufism at an early age. After becoming a faithful adherent of the Hurufism movement, Nasimi left Azerbaijan to spread Hurufism in Anatolia and later Aleppo following the execution of its founder and Nasimi's teacher, Fazlallah Astarabadi. In Hurufi thought, scriptural letters form the basis of all sacred knowledge, and God is revealed in the human face. In Aleppo, he gained followers as a Hurufi sheikh but faced resistance from Sunni circles who eventually convinced the Mamluk sultan to order his death for his religious beliefs around 1418–19. Nasimi was executed and buried in a Sufi lodge (takya) in Aleppo.

His surviving works include two dīvāns (collections of poems) in Azerbaijani and Persian, along with some poems in Arabic. Nasimi's poems mainly centre on Hurufism and contain many references to Islamic texts. His poetry combines harmonious melodies and easily understood expressions with more complex topics related to religion. Nasimi had great influence on Turkic literature and influenced many major future poets such as Habibi, Haqiqi (pen name of Jahan Shah), Khatai (pen name of Ismail I), among others.

== Name ==
Nasimi's given name was Ali, but he adopted the epithet (laqab) Imadaddin (Note: Also spelled as İmadeddin, İmâdüddin, ʿEmād-al-dīn, or ʿImād al-Dīn.) ('Pillar of Faith'), which superseded his original name in use. Some sources attribute other names to him, such as Nesîmüddin, Celâleddin and Ömer.

His most prevalent pen name was Nasimi. Its etymology is disputed but most plausibly explained as an echo of Naimi, the pen name of Nasimi's teacher Fazlallah Astarabadi. It may also have been derived from the Arabic word nasim, meaning 'breeze, breath of wind'. He also employed other pen names sporadically, such as Hüseyni, Haşimi, Seyyid, Ali and İmad. His epithet Imadaddin or the title seyid (marking his claim of descent from the Islamic prophet Muhammad) are often added in order to distinguish him from other figures who also bore the name Nasimi.

== Biography ==
Much of Nasimi's life is considered obscure. His year of birth is uncertain, but it is commonly assumed to be 1369–70 without conclusive evidence. Some sources state that he was born in 1339. His exact birthplace is also contested: it has been argued as Shamakhi, Tabriz, Baghdad, Aleppo, Shiraz or Diyarbakır. At the turn of the 14th and 15th centuries, when he lived, religious conservatism was widespread, and his homeland had been ravaged by Mongol incursions. He was of Azerbaijani Turkic origin and spoke Azerbaijani as his native language, as well as fluent Persian and Arabic.

Nasimi had a good education as a child and pursued Sufism at an early age. While in Tabriz, he met the mystic Fazlallah Astarabadi, who introduced him to Hurufism. Nasimi stayed with him in Baku and Shirvan for some time and became one of the most faithful adherents of the Hurufism movement, as well as Astarabadi's successor (khalifa). After the Timurid emperor Miran Shah executed Astarabadi for his religious views, Nasimi left Azerbaijan and travelled to Anatolia to spread Hurufism. He arrived in Bursa during Murad I's (r. 1362–1389) reign but was not welcomed there. He also attempted to meet the Sufi saint Haji Bayram Veli in Ankara but was turned away because of his Hurufi beliefs.

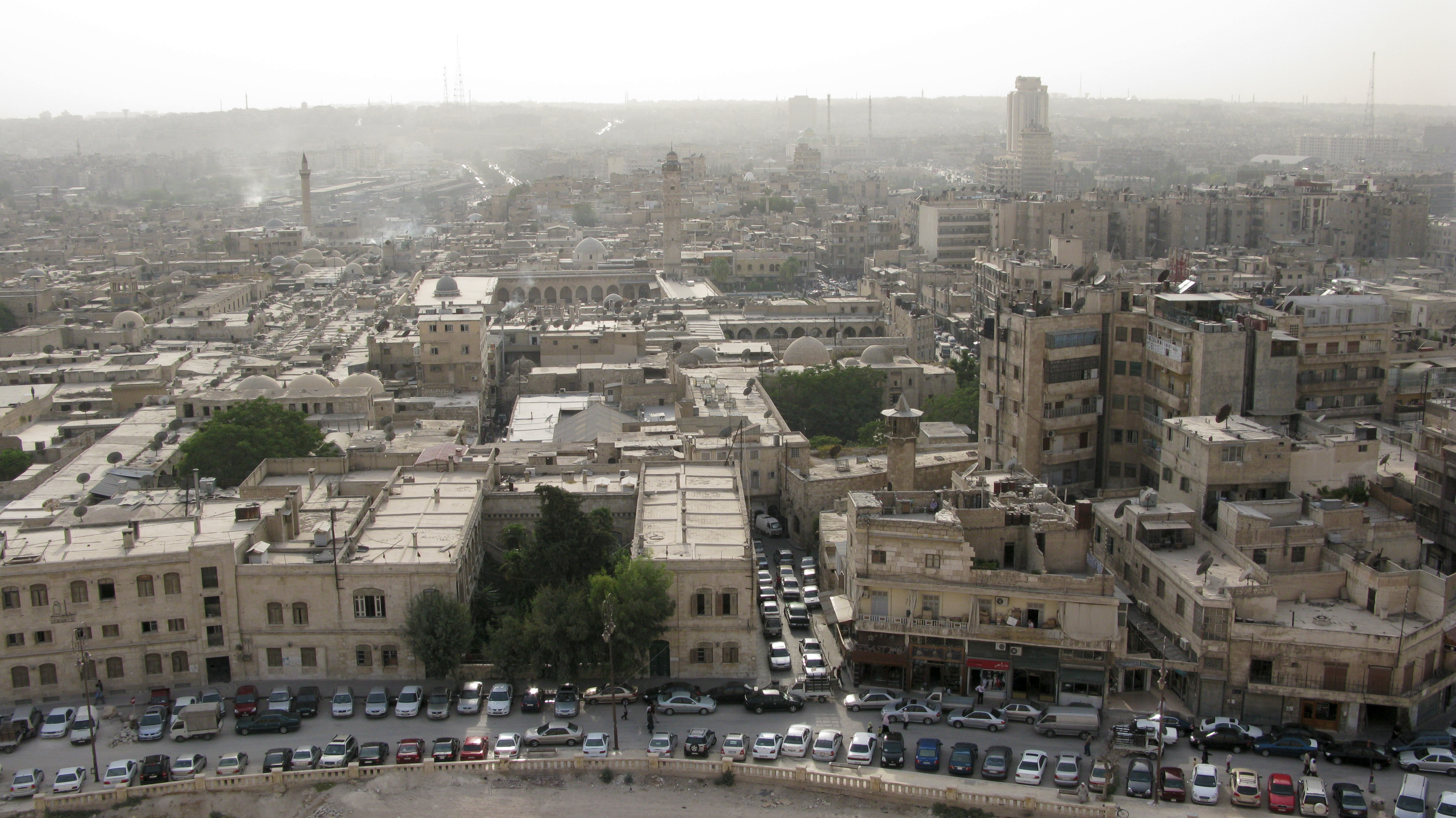
View of Aleppo, where Nasimi spent the later years of his life and where he was executed and buried

Unable to find a suitable environment for his beliefs in Anatolia, he went to Aleppo, which was the main centre of Hurufis in Syria at that time. Islamic scholar Ibn Hajar al-Asqalani wrote about Nasimi's activity in Aleppo as a Hurufi sheikh and his increasing followers. He used his poetry skills to further spread his beliefs. His ideas, such as "the human face being the manifestation of God" and "describing all the body organs with letters" (Note: A key characteristic of Hurufism was the intricate numerological analysis of the letters in the Perso-Arabic alphabet, and an effort to associate them with the human form.) faced resistance in Sunni circles. In Aleppo, Nasimi continued to fight for freedom of expression through his poetry, challenging strict rules and religious intolerance. Some contemporary Arab sources say that a group of Sunni Muslim scholars who followed the main schools of law tried to get Nasimi killed by the Mamluk deputy of Aleppo based on vague rumours, but they failed. The deputy then reportedly referred the case to the Mamluk sultan Al-Mu'ayyad Shaykh (r. 1412–1421) in Cairo, who ordered Nasimi's death, likely due to his religious beliefs; Nasimi is sometimes referred to as a kafir, or unbeliever. According to the Turkologist Michael Hess, while some sources claim that Nasimi was killed by being flayed alive, there is no clear evidence of this in contemporary sources. Some texts do mention flaying, but it may have been done posthumously for the purpose of public display. The most likely year of execution is 1418–9, although some historians suggest 1417 and other dates have also been proposed. Nasimi's body was buried in a takkah (Sufi lodge) named after him in Aleppo.

Nasimi's execution is believed to have had a political component due to his Turkic ancestry, which brought him closer to Mamluks' rival Turkic dynasties in Syria and Anatolia. According to Hess, Al-Mu'ayyad's order to distribute pieces of Nasimi's body to local Turkic rulers like the Dulkadir and the Aq Qoyunlu was motivated by politics.

== Poetry ==
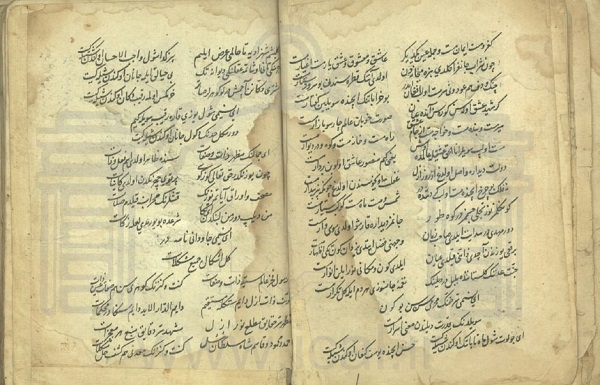
Pages from the Azerbaijani dīvān of Nasimi

Nasimi's surviving works include two dīvāns (collections of poems), one in Azerbaijani and the other in Persian. Although the 16th-century Ottoman poet and bibliographer Latifî claimed that Nasimi had a "dīvān in all three languages", implying the existence of an Arabic dīvān as well, no evidence of such a work has been found. His Azerbaijani dīvān contains over four hundred ghazals (a form of love poetry) and several hundred other poems, including mas̱navīs (a poem written in rhyming couplets) and quatrains (a four-line poem). According to the Turkologist Kathleen Burrill, Nasimi was able to maintain the quality of his Azerbaijani language in his poetry while using the ʿarūż form (poetry using quantifying prosody). This sets him apart from later poets who relied heavily on borrowing from Persian because of what Burrill described as their "lack of skill" in mastering the ʿarūż form. His Persian dīvān consists of almost three hundred ghazals and discusses topics such as Hurufism, praise to Twelve Imams and Imam Ali, as well as Fazlallah Astarabadi.

Nasimi's writing style often involves repeating sounds and grammatical patterns. His poems mainly centre on Hurufism and contain many references to Islamic texts such as the Quran. However, some of the beliefs behind his poems fall outside of mainstream Islam. Michael Hess states that Nasimi's poetry blends easily comprehensible language with more intricate themes related to Hurufism. Hess also notes that while Nasimi's poems have remained popular due to their emotional depth and technical proficiency, the concepts behind them are not as widely understood. Burrill notes that some of Nasimi's poems can be difficult to read due to their complex religious references, when this is not the case, they convey his themes of love through "easy-flowing, harmonious melodies".

== Legacy ==
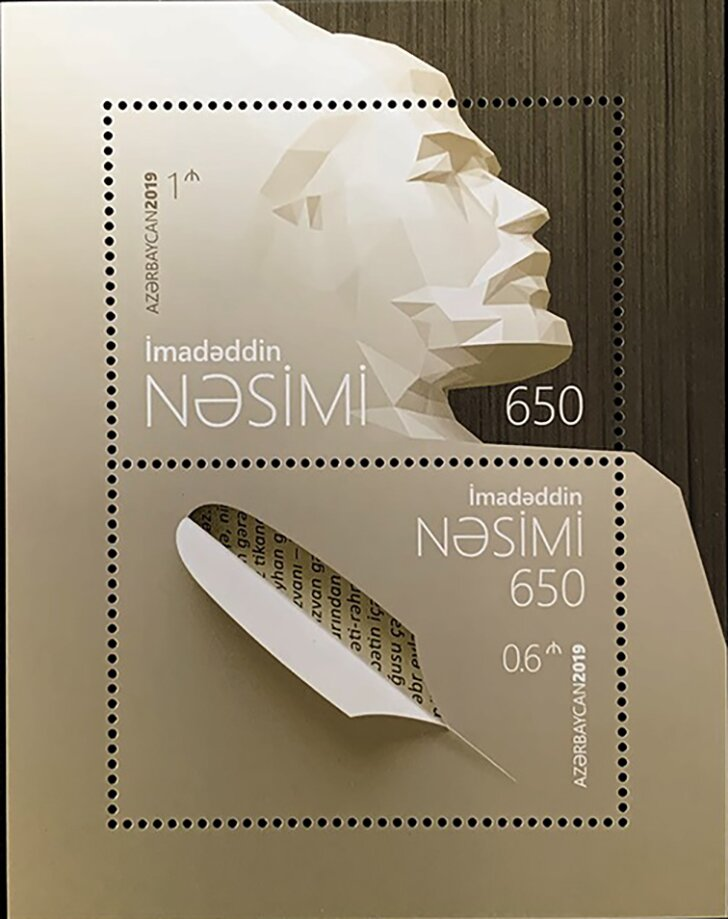
Azerbaijani stamp commemorating the 650th anniversary of Nasimi's birth, 2019

Nasimi is considered one of the greatest figures of Turkic literature. According to the modern scholar Sakina Berengian, Nasimi was the first major poet not only in Azerbaijani literature but also in all of Turkic literature. His influence on poetry extended throughout the Turkic world and impacted major poets such as Habibi, Haqiqi (pen name of Jahan Shah), Khatai (pen name of Ismail I), and others. Nasimi is also regarded as the founder of Azerbaijani classical ʿarūż poetry, ghazal poetry, as well as the first lyric poet in Oghuz Turkic classic literature. His works had a significant impact on the development of both Azerbaijani and Ottoman literature. Nasimi's style has greatly influenced the general style of Azerbaijani poetry. According to the professors of Turkish literature Azmi Bilgin and İlyas Üzüm, the Timurid poet Ali-Shir Nava'i's words of praise about Nasimi show that he was also considered an "important personality in the Central Asian Turkic world".

In 1973, UNESCO included the 600th anniversary of Nasimi's birth in its calendar of anniversaries for worldwide celebration. Representatives from many countries participated in the celebrations held in Baku and Moscow. Tokay Mammadov was commissioned to create Nasimi's statue. Due to the short time frame for completion, Tokay Mammadov collaborated with his colleague Ibrahim Zeynalov. Initially, a 69-centimeter model and a 2-meter mock-up of the statue were prepared. Subsequently, based on this mock-up, a 6.5-meter statue of Nasimi was created and installed in one of the central gardens of the city. In Azerbaijan, 2019 was declared the "Year of Nasimi" to commemorate the 650th anniversary of the poet's birth. A street, a metro station, and a district in Baku are also named after Nasimi. The National Institute of Linguistics of Azerbaijan is also named in his honour. Additionally, there is a 1973 Azerbaijani biopic film about his life.

In 2019, an asteroid that was discovered at Kleť Observatory in 1995 was named "32939 Nasimi" in honour of the poet.

In 2025 the YARAT Contemporary Art Space, Baku, presented an international art project by the Ukrainian curator Kostyantyn Doroshenko "I and the Ark, I and the Great Flood" with a modern interpretation of the philosophy of Nasimi, in which artists from Azerbaijan, Ukraine Georgia, Lithuania, Bosnia and Herzegovina and Czech Republic participated. .

== See also ==
- Alevism
- Isma'ilism
