= Taqi Rafat =

Iranian poet (1889–1920)

Mirza Taghi Khan Raf'at
- میرزا تقی‌خان رفعت
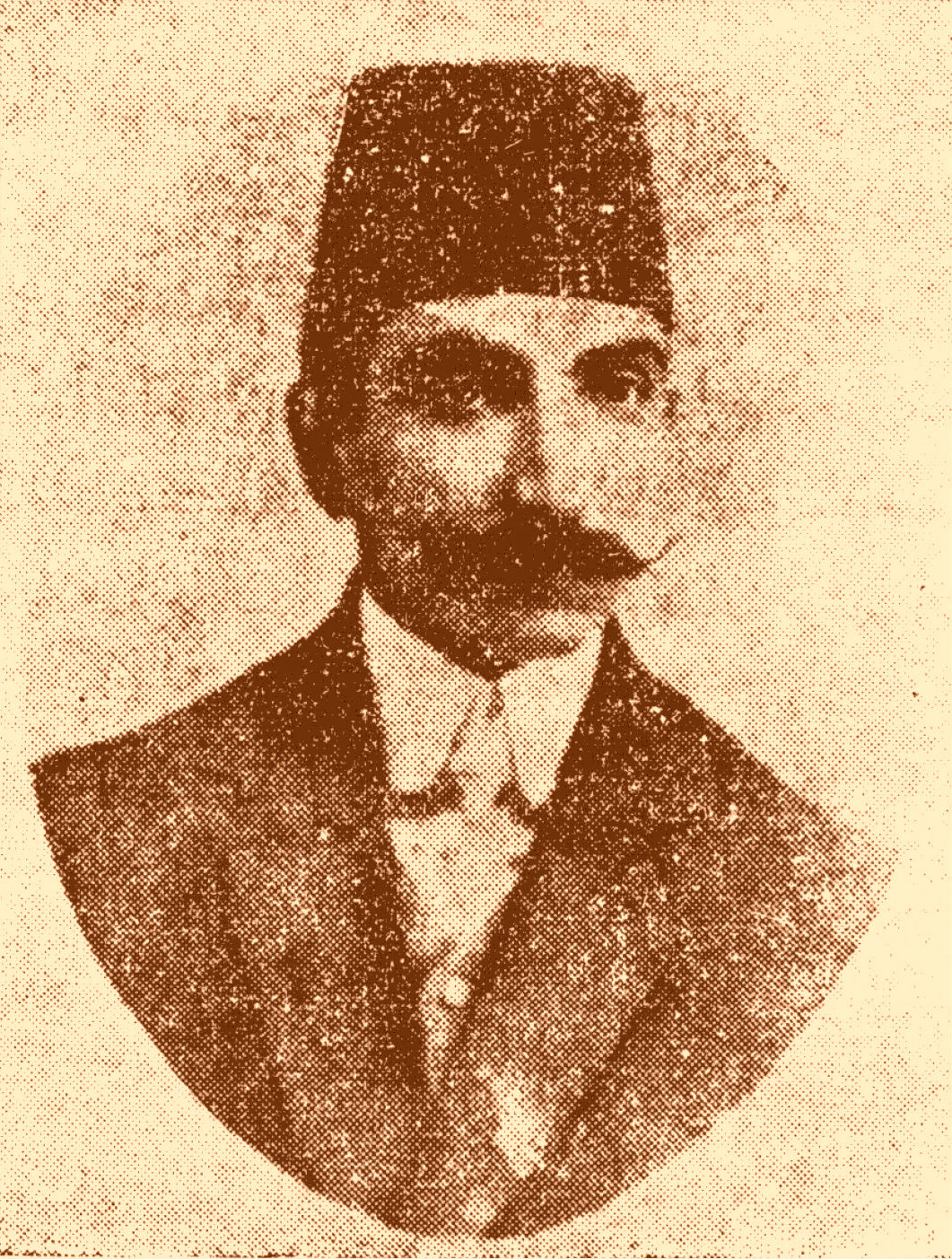
- Born: c. 1889; Tabriz, Iran
- Died: 1920
- Occupations: Poet, Journalist, Dramatist
- Father: Agha Mohammad Tabrizi

Mirza Taghi Khan Raf'at (Persian: میرزا تقی خان رفعت; c. 1889–1920) was an Iranian poet. He was a modernist poet who wrote in Turkish and French as well as Persian. Politically, he was a follower of Mohammad Khiabani, and edited the latter's newspaper, Tajaddod ("Modernity"), an organ of the Democratic Party of Azerbaijan, as well as the magazine Azadistan. When Khiabani's movement was violently crushed, Rafat committed suicide in a small village near Tabriz.

His arguments with Malek-osh-Sho'arā Bahār, a traditionalist poet are famous. he was a reformist with a hot tongue who criticized the old ways of literature in Iran and was pushing for reforms in both form and content in order to revolutionize the core of Persian Literature, especially in poetry.

He was the son of Agha Mohammad Tabrizi. He was educated in Istanbul and during World War I returned to Tabriz to teach French in high school.

== See also ==
- Ismail Amirkhizi
