= Azadistan (magazine) =

Persian language magazine (1920)

Azadistan (Note: Persian: آزادیستان, romanized: Āzādīstān) was a Persian-language literary and cultural magazine based in Tabriz, Iran. It was founded in 1920 by Mohammad Khiabani.
