= Nasimi Institute of Linguistics =

Azerbaijani research institute

Institute of Linguistics
- Founder: Azerbaijan National Academy of Sciences
- Established: 1932
- Head: Nadir Memmedli
- Location: Baku, Azerbaijan
- Website: http://dilcilik.az/

The Nasimi Institute of Linguistics (Azerbaijani: Nəsimi adına Dilçilik İnstitutu) is one of the institutes of the Department of Humanities and Social Sciences of the National Academy of Sciences of Azerbaijan.

== History ==
In 1932 the Institute of Linguistics, Literature, and Art was established on the basis of the Azerbaijan State Research Institute. The independent Institute of Linguistics was established on March 27 and approved on May 21, 1945. Yusif Mirbabayev was elected the first director of the institute. In 1951, the Institute of Linguistics merged with the Institute of Literature and became independent again in September 1969. In 1973, the Institute of Linguistics was named after the Azerbaijani poet Nasimi.

To carry out the tasks arising from the Order of the President of Azerbaijan Ilham Aliyev "State program on the use of Azerbaijani language in accordance with the requirements of time in the globalized environment and the development of linguistics in the country" dated May 23, 2012, in November 2013, another meeting of ANAS was held. Structural changes were made at the Institute of Linguistics named after Nasimi. As a result, some departments were closed or merged, a number of new departments were created.

Since 2016 the head of the institute has been Mohsun Naghısoylu.

A working group "Spelling Dictionary of the Azerbaijani language" was established at the Institute of Linguistics in 2018. Another working group, "Nasimi: Language Studies” was founded in 2019.

== Activity ==
At the beginning of the activity, the Institute of Linguistics consisted of four departments (modern Azerbaijani language, history of Azerbaijani language, Azerbaijani dialectology, and vocabulary).

More than 600 monographs and collages have been published so far.

The main activity of the Institute is:

- researching sources and the history of the development of the Azerbaijani language
- making a comparative typological analysis of the Azerbaijani language with other Turkic, as well as, unrelated languages
- learning the languages of ethnic groups living in Azerbaijan
- compilation of dictionaries of various types.

== See also ==
- Azerbaijan National Academy of Sciences
