= Ismayil Jafarpour =

Azerbaijani poet (1925–1977)

- İsmayıl Cəfərpur
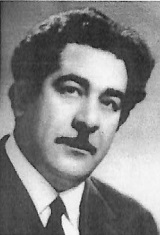
- Born: 5 March 1925; Salmas, Iran
- Died: 18 February 1977 (aged 51); Baku, Azerbaijan SSR
- Writing career
- Language: Azerbaijani

Ismayil Jafarpour (Azerbaijani: İsmayıl Cəfərpur; 5 March 1925 - 18 February 1977) was an Azerbaijani orientalist, poet.

During the period of the Azerbaijan National Government, he was appointed the head of the partisan detachment, the military commandant of the city of Salmas, and the chief of police in the cities of Salmas and Tabriz. He was awarded the "21 Azer" Medal for his work.

After the fall of the Azerbaijan People's Government, he moved to Baku and graduated from the Faculty of Oriental Studies of ASU. Here he engaged in scientific and literary activities.
