= Mohammad Khiabani =

Iranian politician

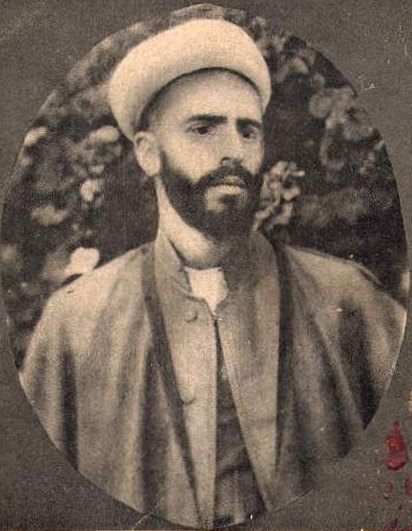
- In the caption one reads: "Āghā Shaikh Mohammad Khiābāni, the leader of the Freedom Fighters of Azerbaijan who was martyred"

Member of the Iranian Parliament
- In office 6 December 1914 – 13 November 1915
- Constituency: Tabriz

Personal details
- Born: 1879 Khameneh, Iran
- Died: 1920 (aged 40–41) Tabriz, Iran
- Party: Democrat Party

Shaikh Mohammad Khiābāni (Persian: شیخ محمد خیابانی; 1880–1920), sometimes spelled Khiyabani, also known as Shaikh Mohammad Khiābāni Tabrizi, was an Iranian Shia cleric, political leader, and representative to the parliament.

He was born in Khameneh, near Tabriz to Haji Abdolhamid (his father) from Khameneh, a merchant. He became active during the Persian Constitutional Revolution and was a prominent dissident against foreign colonialism, which subsequently led to him being sent into exile by the Ottomans in 1918.

After the Russian Revolution of 1917, Khiabani re-established the Democrat Party of Tabriz after being banned for five years, and published the Tajaddod newspaper, the official organ of the party, edited by his supporter Taqi Rafat. Later, in a protest to the 1919 Treaty between Iran and the United Kingdom, which exclusively transferred the rights of deciding about all military, financial, and customs affairs of Persia to the British, he revolted and took Tabriz and surrounding areas, calling it Azadistan ("land of liberty"); he was not, however, a separatist. Khiabani and his followers chose the name "Azadistan" as a gesture of protest against the giving of the name "Azerbaijan" to the government centered on Baku in Transcaucasia which is called Azerbaijan Democratic Republic. After the fall of Vosough od-Dowleh, the then prime minister, the new prime minister sent Mehdi Qoli Hedayat to Tabriz, giving him full authority, and he crushed and killed Khiabani in the late summer of 1920 (Hedayat claimed that Khiabani had committed suicide).
