= Azadistan =

Short-lived state in Iran (1920)

- 1920
- Flag
- Capital: Tabriz
- Common languages: Azerbaijani, Persian
- Head of State
  - 1920: Mohammad Khiabani
- History
  - Established: early April 1920
  - Disestablished: 13 September
- Today part of: Iran

Azadistan (Persian: آزادستان, romanized: Âzâdestân, lit. 'The Land of Freedom'), was a short-lived state in Iranian Azerbaijan that lasted from early 1920 until September of that year. It was established by Mohammad Khiabani, an Iranian patriot, who was a representative to the parliament, and a prominent dissident against the Soviet Union and British colonialism. Khiabani and his followers chose the name "Azadistan" as a gesture of protest against the giving of the name "Azerbaijan" to the government centered on Baku in Transcaucasia which was called Azerbaijan Democratic Republic, and also to serve as a model of freedom and independence for the rest of Iran.

Shortly after the Russian Revolution of 1917, Khiabani re-established the Democrat Party of Tabriz after being banned for five years, and published the Tajaddod newspaper, the official organ of the party.

After the end of World War I, in a protest to the 1919 Treaty between Persia and the United Kingdom, which exclusively transferred the rights of deciding about all military, financial, and customs affairs of Persia to the British, Khiabani disputed control of Tabriz with the central government of Vosough od-Dowleh in Tehran and, in 1920, Khiabani proclaimed Azerbaijan to be Azadistan, to provide a model of freedom and democratic governance for the rest of Iran. He considered himself not a separatist but an Iranian nationalist. Following the capture of the police station, Khiabani issued a statement on behalf of the Democratic Party's board of directors in both Persian and French stating that the Sheikh's plan was to establish public order and to execute the constitution of Iran.

Khiabani's movement was suppressed militarily on 4 September 1920. After the fall of prime minister Vosough od-Dowleh the new prime minister sent Mehdi Qoli Hedayat to Tabriz, giving him full authority, and he crushed and killed Khiabani in the late summer of 1920 and Azadistan was dissolved.

== In fiction ==
- In the anime Mobile Suit Gundam 00, Azadistan is a sovereign country located in the Middle East.

== See also ==
- Constitutional Revolution of Iran
