= Mehdi Qoli Hedayat =

Prime Minister of Iran (1864–1955)

- مهدی‌قلی هدایت
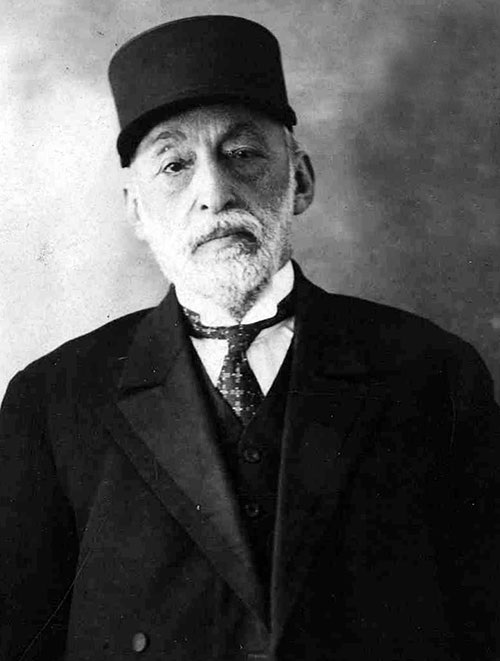
- Hedayat in 1929

17th Prime Minister of Iran
- In office 2 June 1927 – 18 September 1933
- Monarch: Reza Shah
- Preceded by: Mostowfi ol-Mamalek
- Succeeded by: Mohammad-Ali Foroughi

Chief Justice of Iran
- In office 25 April 1927 – 2 June 1927
- Appointed by: Reza Shah
- Preceded by: Mohammad-Ali Foroughi
- Succeeded by: Nasrollah Akhavi

Minister of Justice
- In office 27 October 1907 – 21 December 1907
- Prime Minister: Abolqasem Naser ol-Molk

Minister of Science Acting
- In office 17 March 1907 – 29 April 1907
- Prime Minister: Soltan-Ali Vazir-e Afkham (Acting)

Personal details
- Born: 1863 Tehran, Sublime State of Iran
- Died: 21 September 1955 (aged 92) Tehran, Imperial State of Iran
- Resting place: Hedayat Library, Darrous
- Party: Independent; Revival Party (1927–1930)
- Spouse: Naireolmolk
- Children: 6
- Relatives: Reza-Qoli Khan Hedayat (grandfather)
- Nickname(s): Mokhber-ol Saltaneh مخبرالسلطنه

Mehdi Qoli Khan Hedayat (Persian: مهدی‌قلی هدایت; 1863 – 21 September 1955), also known as Mokhber-ol Saltaneh (مخبرالسلطنه), was Prime Minister of Iran and an author of several books on Iranian music, modern education, poetry, current affairs, and most notably a memoir covering his political tenure under the last 6 shahs of Iran.

== Early life ==
He was the third son of Ali Qoli Khan, “Mokhber-ol Dowleh I” and grandson of Reza-Qoli Khan Hedayat (historian of the Qajar era and director of Iran's first polytechnic institute, the Dar-ol Fonun in Tehran).

Mehdi Qoli Hedayat received a broad traditional education, including courses in western science. In 1878, he was sent to Berlin to visit a school, although he soon left the school for private tutelage. His stay in Germany (from which he returned, fluent in German, in 1879) was a formative experience in his future perception of western influence on Iranian culture.

== Qajar era ==
In 1885 Hedayat taught at the Dar-ol Fonun, and was made special chamberlain ( piš-ḵedmat-e ḵāṣṣ ) by Naser al-Din Shah Qajar in 1893. After the death of his father in 1897, Mozaffar ad-Din Shah Qajar bestowed the title Mokhber-os Saltaneh on Hedayat, and he accompanied the monarch as a German interpreter on his trip to Europe in 1901.

After a year Hedayat returned to Iran and worked as a translator at the imperial court, influencing Mozaffar ad-Din Shah's granting of the Persian Constitution in 1906. Prior to that, being a member of the circle close to Mirza Ali Asghar Khan Amin al-Soltan, an influential aristocrat and several time prime minister of Iran, he joined the aforementioned on an around the globe tour in 1903, becoming one of the first Iranians in modern times to visit the Russian Far East, Imperial China, Meiji Japan, Hawaii, and the United States. The intention of the trip was to reach Mecca for performing "Hajj", albeit through an exotic route, and apparently the group derived sheer pleasure from sending postcards and telegrams to rival aristocrats in Tehran, from destinations previously unheard of. He meticulously recorded the events of this escapade in a travelogue which was later published in Tehran. On his return, after briefly serving as Governor General of Azerbaijan in 1908, he was appointed Governor of Azerbaijan from 1909 until his resignation in August 1911 due to Russian pressure on the central government in Tehran. As Governor General of Fars province 1912, the central government had to cede to the British insistence to replace him and recalled Hedayat on 13 September 1915.

As Minister of Justice, the Interior, Public Instruction, Finance and Public Works, Hedayat headed a number of ministries in several short-lived cabinets.

== Pahlavi era ==
In 1926, Mostowfi ol-Mamalek became prime minister for the sixth time. Hedayat was appointed to the Ministry of Commerce and appointed public benefits and statesmanship; he was later elected president of the Supreme Court under Ali-Akbar Davar, Minister of Justice. Hedayat served nearly six-and-a-half years as prime minister to Rezā Shāh Pahlavi; his premiership was conservative (laying a foundation for dictatorship), and he was dismissed in September 1933.

Hedayat died on 21 September 1955 at the age of 92.

Political offices
Preceded by Mostowfi ol-Mamalek	Prime Minister of Iran; 1927–1933	Succeeded by Mohammad-Ali Foroughi
