= List of Iranian Azerbaijanis =

Iranian Azerbaijanis (Persian: آذربایجانی‌های ایران; Azerbaijani: ایران آذربایجانلیلاری) are Iranians of Azerbaijani origin. They form the largest group of Azerbaijanis in the world, and are the second-largest ethnic group in Iran, accounting for about 16–35% of the total population. Iranian Azerbaijanis are most commonly referred to as "Turks" in both Persian and Azerbaijani, whilst the language is known as Turki (Turkish). However, "Azeri" or "Azerbaijani" are often used as identifiers.

Native to and primarily concentrated in the Azerbaijan region, Iranian Azerbaijanis have settled throughout the country, constituting a significant minority in the provinces of Kurdistan, Hamadan, Qazvin, Gilan, Alborz, Tehran, Markazi, and other regions. Iranian Azerbaijanis have been influential in many fields; they played a crucial role in the modern Iranian state's national development, particularly during the early 20th century.

== Arts and entertainment ==
=== Music ===
==== Singers ====
- Fatma Mukhtarova (1893 or 1898–1972), opera singer; Soviet citizen born in Urmia, Iran.
- Rubaba Muradova (1930–1983), opera and folk singer; Soviet citizen born in Ardabil, Iran.
- Aref (1940–2026), pop singer and actor.
- Homeyra (born 1945), pop singer.
- Rashid Vatandoust (born 1946), opera singer.
- Sattar (born 1949), pop and classical singer.
- Googoosh (born 1950), pop singer and actress.
- Hayedeh (1942–1990), pop singer; elder sister of Mahasti.
- Mahasti (1946–2007), pop singer.
- Dariush (born 1951), pop singer.
- Davoud Azad (born 1963), classical singer, composer, and multi-instrumentalist.
- Hassan Anami Olia (born 1967), opera singer; Azerbaijani citizen born in Tabriz, Iran.
- Rahim Shahriari (born 1971), pop singer and songwriter.
- Mansour (born 1971), pop singer, actor, and fashion designer.
- Arash (born 1977), pop singer and producer; Iranian-Swedish.
- Sami Yusuf (born 1980), world singer, songwriter, and multi-instrumentalist; Iranian-British.
- Omid Hajili (born 1983), pop singer and composer.

==== Composers and instrumentalists ====
- Gholamhossein Bigjekhani (1918–1987), tar player.
- Ali Salimi (1922–1997), composer and tar player.
- Samin Baghtcheban (1923–2008), composer, author and literary translator.
- Farhad Fakhreddini (born 1939), composer and conductor.
- Nasrollah Nasehpour (born 1940), composer and singer.
- Mahmud Shaterian (1944–2006), composer and tar player.
- Naser Cheshmazar (1950–2018), composer and pianist.
- Hossein Alizadeh (born 1951), composer and multi-instrumentalist.
- Dariush Pirniakan (born 1955), composer and tar player.

=== Media ===
==== Filmmakers ====
- Mustafa Mardanov (1894–1968), actor; Soviet citizen born in Marand, Iran.
- Jamileh Sheykhi (1930–2001), actress; mother of Atila Pesyani.
- Ebrahim Abadi (1934–2019), actor.
- Reza Beyk Imanverdi (1936–2003) actor and director.
- Behrouz Vossoughi (born 1938), actor.
- Jahangir Ghaffari (born 1940), actor and film producer.
- Reza Naji (born 1942), actor.
- Valiollah Momeni (1943–2015), actor.
- Jamshid Hashempour (born 1944), actor.
- Atash Taghipour (born 1945), actor.
- Mina Jafarzadeh (born 1947), actress.
- Jalil Farjad (born 1952), actor.
- Alireza Khamseh (born 1953), actor and comedian.
- Jahangir Almasi (born 1955), actor.
- Parviz Parastui (born 1955), actor.
- Atila Pesyani (born 1957), actor.
- Afsar Asadi (born 1958), actress and make-up artist.
- Akbar Abdi (born 1960), actor.
- Shirin Bina (born 1964), actress.
- Farhad Ghaemian (born 1965), actor.
- Keyhan Maleki (born 1968), actor.
- Marjaneh Golchin (born 1969), actress.
- Rambod Javan (born 1971), actor, director, and television presenter.
- Mir-Taher Mazloumi (born 1975), actor.
- Amir Aghaei (born 1975), actor and author.
- Hadi Hejazifar (born 1976), actor, director, and screenwriter.
- Hadi Kazemi (born 1976), actor.
- Behnam Tashakor (born 1977), actor.
- Mohammad Reza Golzar (born 1977), actor and model.
- Hossein Abedini (born 1980), actor.
- Hesam Manzour (born 1980), actor.
- Maryam Palizban (born 1981), actress.

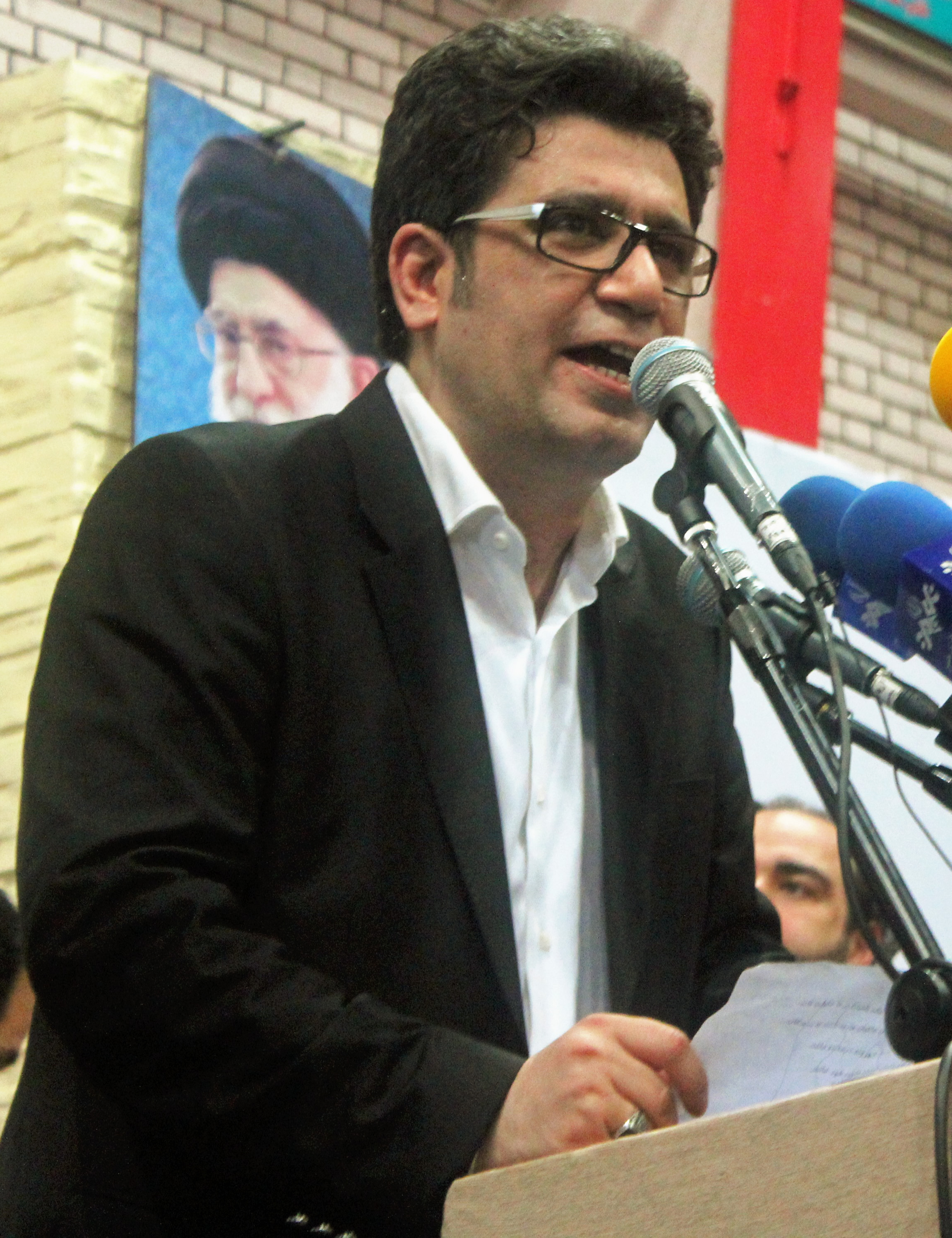
Reza Rashidpour

- Rouhollah Zamani (born 2005) actor.

Broadcasters

- Mobarez Alizadeh (1911–1994), radio broadcaster and translator.
- Bahman Hashemi (born 1962), television presenter and actor
- Javad Khiabani (born 1966), television presenter and sports commentator.
- Reza Rashidpour (born 1978), television presenter, film producer, and actor.

=== Art ===
==== Painters, photographers, cartoonists ====
- Sadighi Beg (1533–1610), painter, miniaturist, and writer.
- Ebrahim Mirza (1540–1577), miniaturist and poet; Safavid prince
- Mir Ali (1795–c.1830), court painter.
- Ahmad Aali (born 1935), photographer.
- Mansoor Ghandriz (1936–1966), painter.
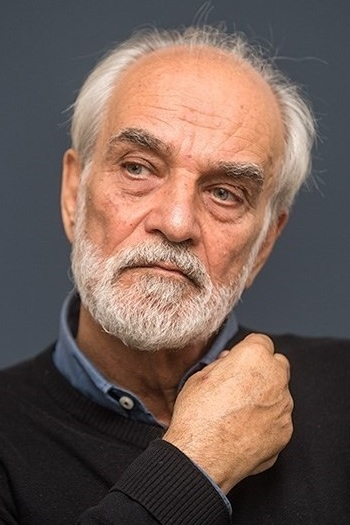
- Aydin Aghdashloo
  Aydin Aghdashloo (born 1940), painter, writer, and art curator.
- Haydar Hatemi (born 1945), painter.
- Reza Deghati (born 1952), photojournalist; Iranian-French.
- Javad Alizadeh (born 1953), cartoonist and writer.
- Khosrow Hassanzadeh (born 1963), painter, installation artist, and ceramist.

==== Calligraphers ====
- Ali Adjali (born 1939), calligrapher, painter, and poet.

==== Sculptors ====
- Ahad Hosseini (born 1944), sculptor and painter.
- Akbar Behkalam (born 1944), sculptor and painter; Iranian-German.

== Literature ==
=== Scholars ===
- Mohammad-Amin Riahi (1923–2009), literary scholar, historian, and poet.
- Reza Seyed-Hosseini (1926–2009), literary translator.
- Jaleh Amouzgar (born 1939), linguist and literary scholar.
- Naser Mansouri (born 1953), linguist and novelist.

=== Journalists ===
- Taghi Rafat (1885–1920), journalist, poet and playwright.
- Sibel Edmonds (born 1970), journalist and translator; Iranian-American.

=== Non-fiction writers ===
- Mohammad Hossein bin Khalaf Tabrizi (1600–1651), lexicographer.
- Mirza Abu Taleb Khan (1752–1805), writer and poet; Iranian-Indian.
- Abbasgulu Bakikhanov (1794–1847), writer, linguist, and historian; Imperial Russian subject born in Qajar Iran.
- Mirza Fathali Akhundzadeh (1812–1878), nationalist writer; Imperial Russian subject born in Qajar Iran.
- Mirza Abdolrahim Talebi Tabrizi (1834–1911), writer and essayist.
- Jalil Mammadguluzadeh (1869–1932), writer and satirist; Soviet citizen of Iranian descent.
- Esmail Amirkhizi (1873–1966), writer and constitutionalist.
- Mohammad Ali Modarres Khiabani (1878–1954), writer and linguist.
- Mirza Ibrahimov (1911–1993) writer, playwright, and public figure; Azerbaijani citizen born in Eyvaq, Iran.
- Abbas Zaryab (1919–1995) historical writer, translator, and literature professor.

=== Fiction writers ===
- Ganjali Sabahi (1906–1990), novelist, short story writer, poet, and literary critic.
- Mir Jalal Pashayev (1908–1978), short story writer and literary critic; Soviet citizen born in Ardabil, Iran.
- Gholam-Hossein Bigdeli (1919–1998), literary scholar, linguist, historian, writer and poet; of Begdili descent.
- Gholam-Hossein Saeedi (1936–1985), fiction and non-fiction writer.
- Samad Behrangi (1939–1968), short story writer, teacher and poet.
- Fariba Vafi (born 1963), novelist and short story writer.
- Mohammadreza Bayrami (born 1965), short story writer and novelist.

=== Poets ===
- Habibi (1470–1519), Azerbaijani-language poet.
- Alghas Mirza (1516–1550), Persian-language poet; Safavid prince.
- Bahram Mirza Safavi (1517–1549), Persian-language poet; Safavid prince.
- Ghovsi Tabrizi (1568–1640), Azerbaijani-language poet.
- Saeb Tabrizi (1592–1676), Persian-language poet.
- Tarzi Afshar (died 1679), Azerbaijani-language poet.
- Khasta Qasem (1684–1760), Azerbaijani-language poet.
- Molla Vali Vidadi (1709–1809), Azerbaijani-language poet.
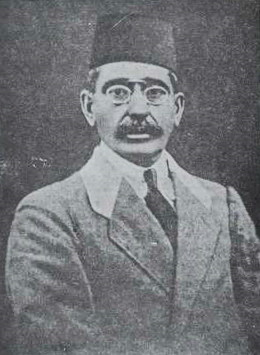
  Iraj Mirza
- Molla Panah Vagif (1717–1797), Azerbaijani-language poet.
- Heyran Donboli (1790–1848), bilingual poet; of Donboli descent.
- Mirza Shafi Vazeh (1794–1852), bilingual poet and teacher.
- Abolqasem Nabati (1812–1873), bilingual poet.
- Agha Baji Javanshir (1780–1832), poet and Qajar royal consort.
- Khurshidbanu Natavan (1832–1897), bilingual poet; Imperial Russian citizen of Iranian descent.
- Bahar Shirvani (1834– 1883), poet and linguist.
- Mirza Ali Khan La'li (1845–1907), poet and physician.
- Ali Mojuz (1874–1934), Azerbaijani-language poet.
- Iraj Mirza (1874–1926), Persian-language poet; Qajar prince.
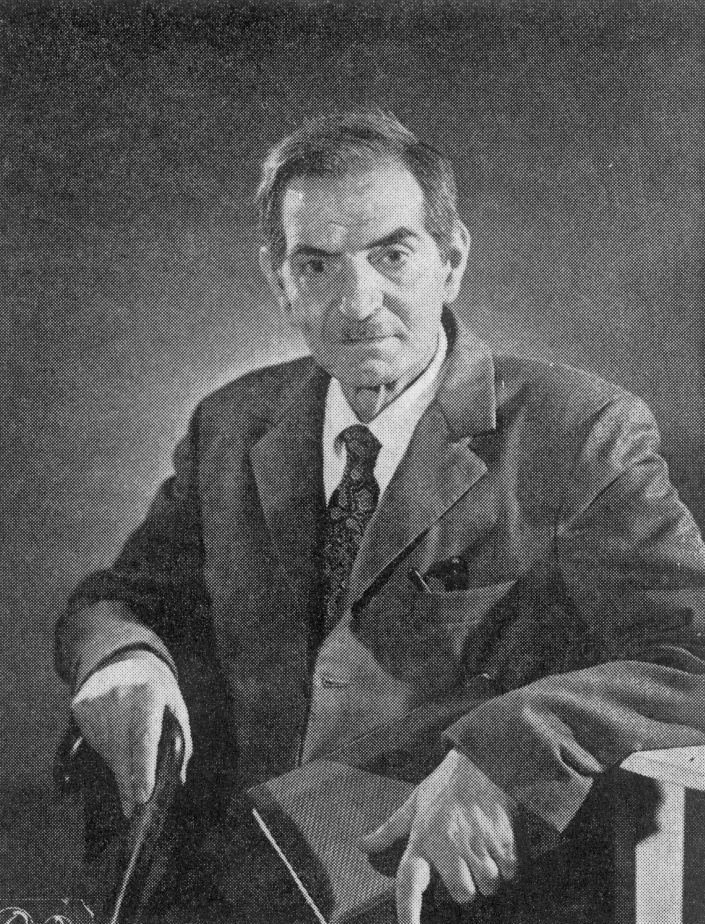
  Mohammad-Hossein Shahriar
- Habib Saher (1903–1988), Azerbaijani-language poet and writer.
- Mohammad-Hossein Shahriar (1906–1988), bilingual poet.
- Ali Nazem (1906–1941), Azerbaijani-language poet and writer; Soviet citizen born in Tabriz.
- Aziz Dowlatabadi (1922–2009), poet, literary scholar and writer.
- Habibollah Chaichian (1923–2017), Persian-language religious poet.
- Bulud Gharachorlu (1926–1979), Azerbaijani-language poet.
- Madina Gulgun (1926–1991), Azerbaijani-language poet and ethnic separatist; Soviet citizen of Iranian descent.
- Yadollah Maftun Amini (1926–2022), bilingual poet.
- Reza Baraheni (1935–2022), Persian-language poet, novelist, and literary critic; Iranian-Canadian.
- Esmail Khoei (1938–2021), Persian-language poet and writer.
- Heydar Abbasi (born 1943), bilingual poet, translator and writer.
- Hossein Monzavi (1946–2004), bilingual poet, essayist, and translator.
- Jafar Ebrahimi (born 1951), Persian-language children's poet and writer.
- Pirouz Dilanchi (born 1965), Azerbaijani-language poet and ethnic separatist; Iranian-Canadian.
- Rasoul Yunan (born 1969), bilingual poet and translator.

== Science ==
=== Applied science ===
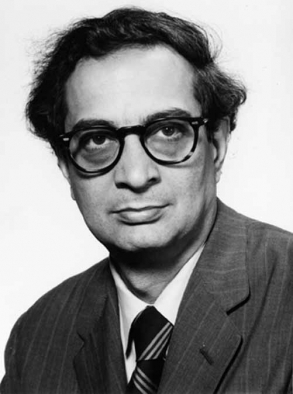
Ali Javan

- Javad Heyat (1925–2014), surgeon, journalist and writer.
- Rahim Rahmanzadeh (born 1934), academic, physician and surgeon; Iranian-German.
- Abbas Alavi (born 1938), scientist in the field of molecular imaging; Iranian-American.

=== Formal science ===
- Mohsen Hashtroodi (1908–1976), mathematician and poet.
- Lotfi A. Zadeh (1921–2017), computer scientist; Azerbaijani citizen of Iranian descent.
- Maryam Sadeghi (born 1980), scientist in the field of medical image computing; Iranian-Canadian.

=== Natural science ===
- Ali Javan (1926–2016), physicist and inventor; Iranian-American.

=== Social science ===
- Alexander Kazembek (1802–1870), orientalist and philologist; Imperial Russian citizen born in Iran.
- Haji-Mirza Hassan Roshdieh (1851–1944), educational theorist, schoolteacher, and writer.
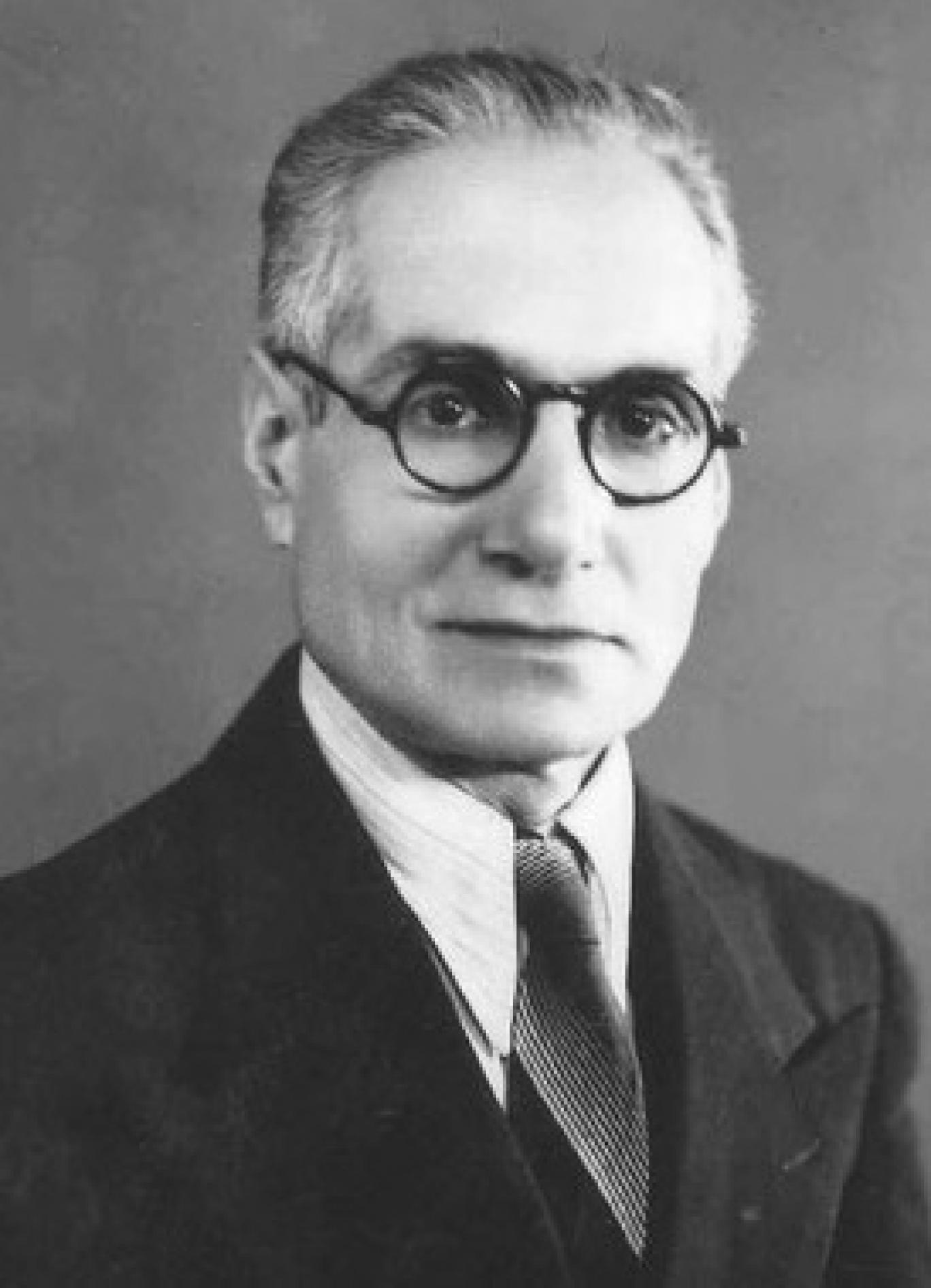
  Ahmad Kasravi
- Jabbar Baghtcheban (1886–1966), schoolteacher and creator of Persian sign language.
- Ahmad Kasravi (1890–1946), linguist, historian, and secularist.
- Hamid Notghi (1920–1999), public relations theorist, lawyer, and writer.
- Ali Murad Davudi (1922–1979), Bahá'í historian and professor.
- Homa Nategh (1934–2016), historian and left-wing activist.
- Dariush Shayegan (1935–2018), cultural theorist and philosopher.
- Shireen Hunter (born 1945), political scientist and diplomat, Iranian-American.
- Javad Tabatabai (1945–2023), nationalist philosopher and political scientist.
- Farideh Heyat (born 1949), anthropologist and writer; British-Iranian.

== Politics ==
=== Government officials ===
- Hassan Taghizadeh (1878–1970), former president of Senate of Iran.
- Mir Bashir Qasimov (1879–1949), former Chairman of the Presidium of the Supreme Soviet of the Azerbaijan SSR; Soviet citizen born in Iran.
- Mohammad Sa'ed (1881–1973), diplomat and 27th prime minister of Iran.
- Mohammad Mosaddegh (1882–1867), 30th prime minister of Iran overthrown in the 1953 Iranian coup d'état; of Qajar descent.
- Abbas Adham (1885–1969), former Iranian minister of health.
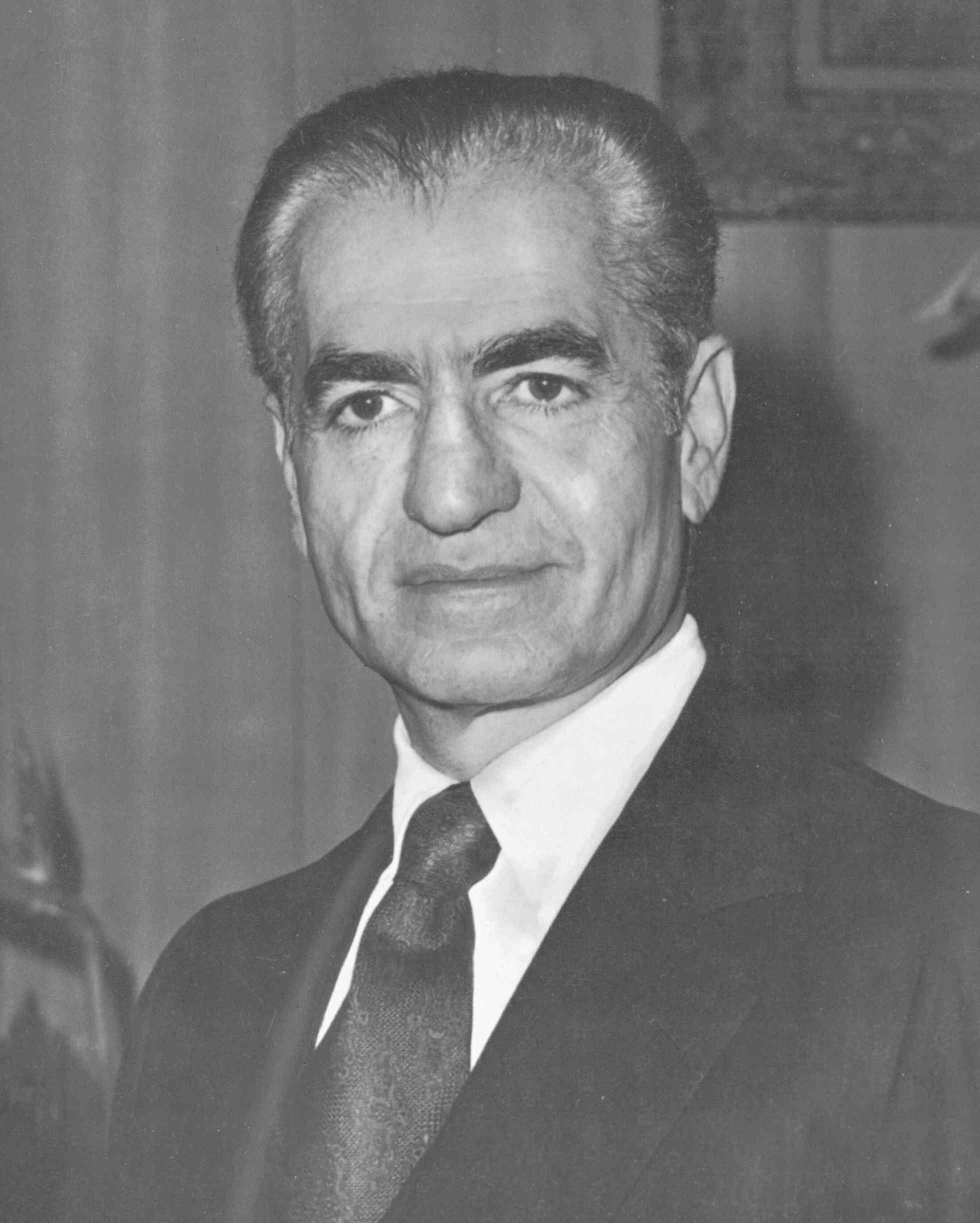
  Mohammad Reza Pahlavi
- Amanollah Jahanbani (1891–1974), former Iranian minister of war; of Qajar descent.
- Ja'far Pishevari (1892–1947), president of the separatist Azerbaijan People's Government.
- Tadj ol-Molouk (1896–1982), royal consort of Reza Shah; born in Baku.
- Mehdi Bazargan (1907–1995), 41st prime minister of Iran.

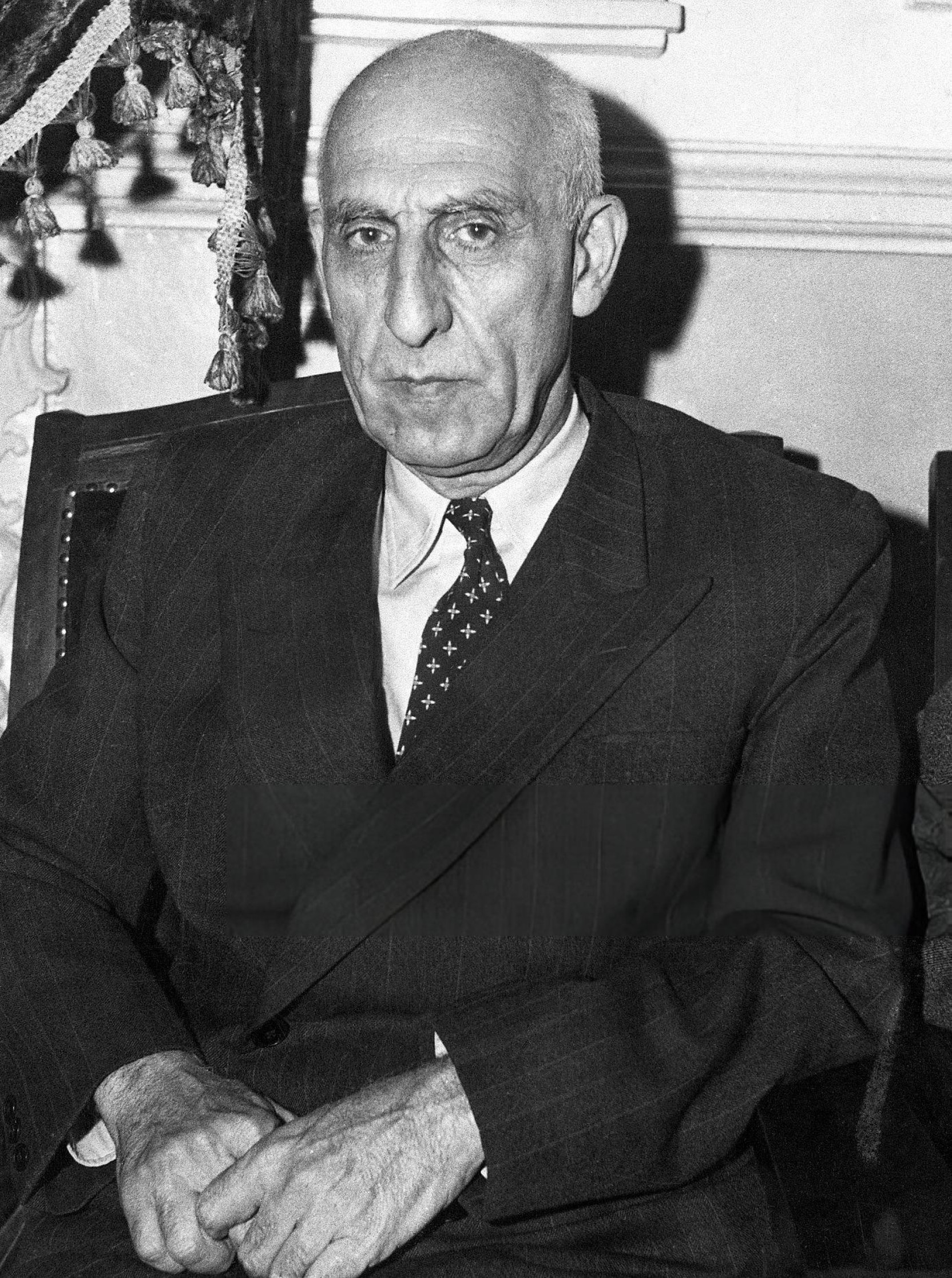
Mohammad Mosaddegh

- Mohammad Reza Pahlavi (1919–1980), last shah of Iran.
- Rahmatollah Moghaddam Maraghei (1921– 2012), former governor of East Azerbaijan.
- Abdolkarim Mousavi Ardebili (1926–2016), second chief justice of Iran.
- Sadegh Khalkhali (1926–2003), first head of the Islamic Revolutionary Court.
- Farah Pahlavi (born 1938), last shahbanu of Iran.
- Hadi Khosroshahi (c.1939–2020), first Iranian Ambassador to the Holy See.
- Ali Khamenei (1939–2026), second supreme leader of Iran.
- Mir-Hossein Mousavi (born 1942), 45th prime minister of Iran.
- Hadi Ghaffari (born 1950), first leader of the Iranian Hezbollah.
- Hossein Hashemi (born 1953), former governor of Tehran.

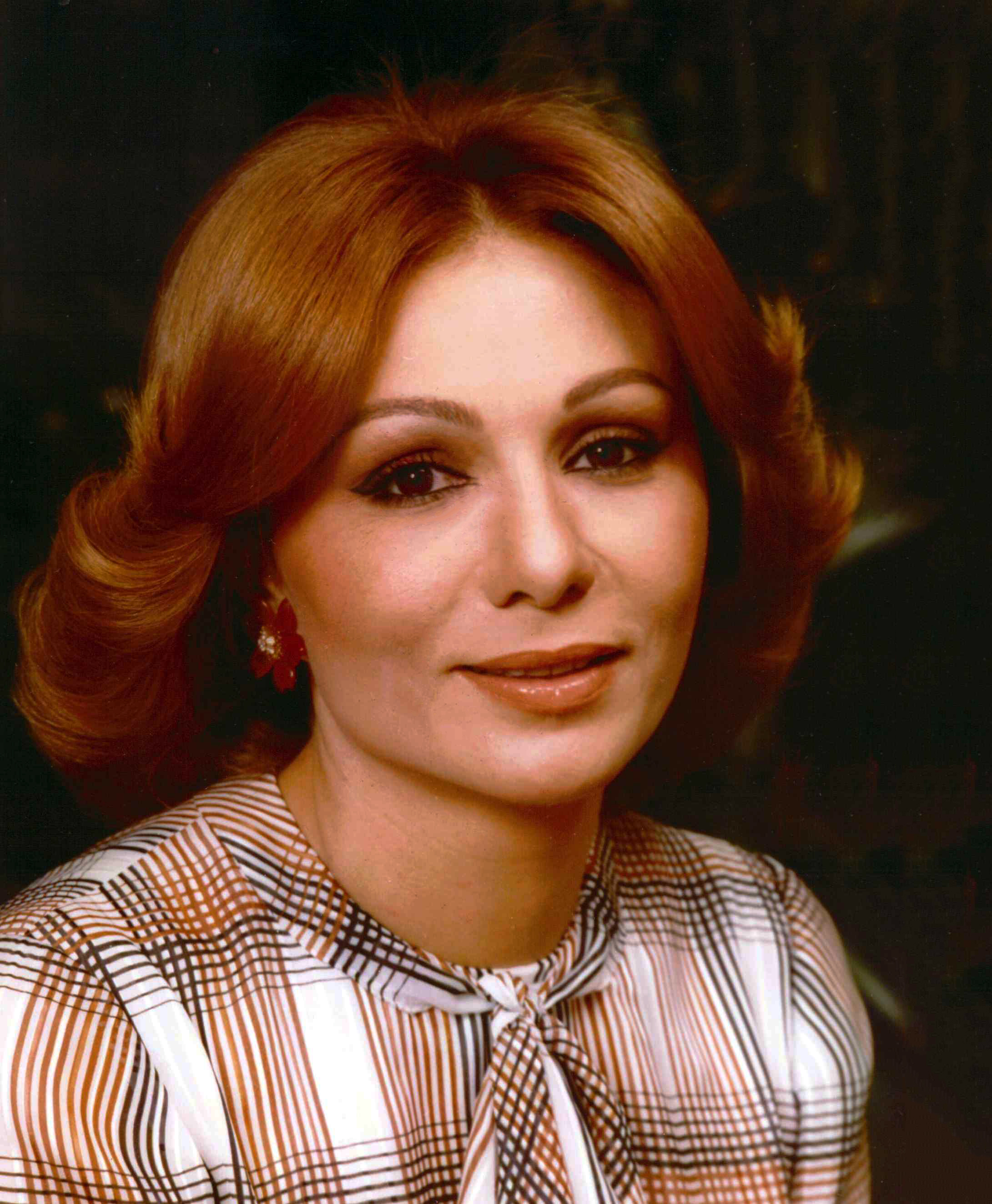
Farah Pahlavi

- Masoud Pezeshkian (born 1954), ninth and current president of Iran.
- Mohsen Mehralizadeh (born 1956), former governor of Isfahan.
- Abdolnaser Hemmati (born 1957), current governor of the Central Bank of Iran.
- Ali Nikzad (born 1961), former governor of Ardabil.

=== Members of parliament ===
- Mohammad Ali Tarbiat (1877–1940), social democratic politician and journalist.
- Mohammad Khiabani (1880–1920), social democratic politician and cleric.
- Asghar Parsa (1919–2007), nationalist politician.
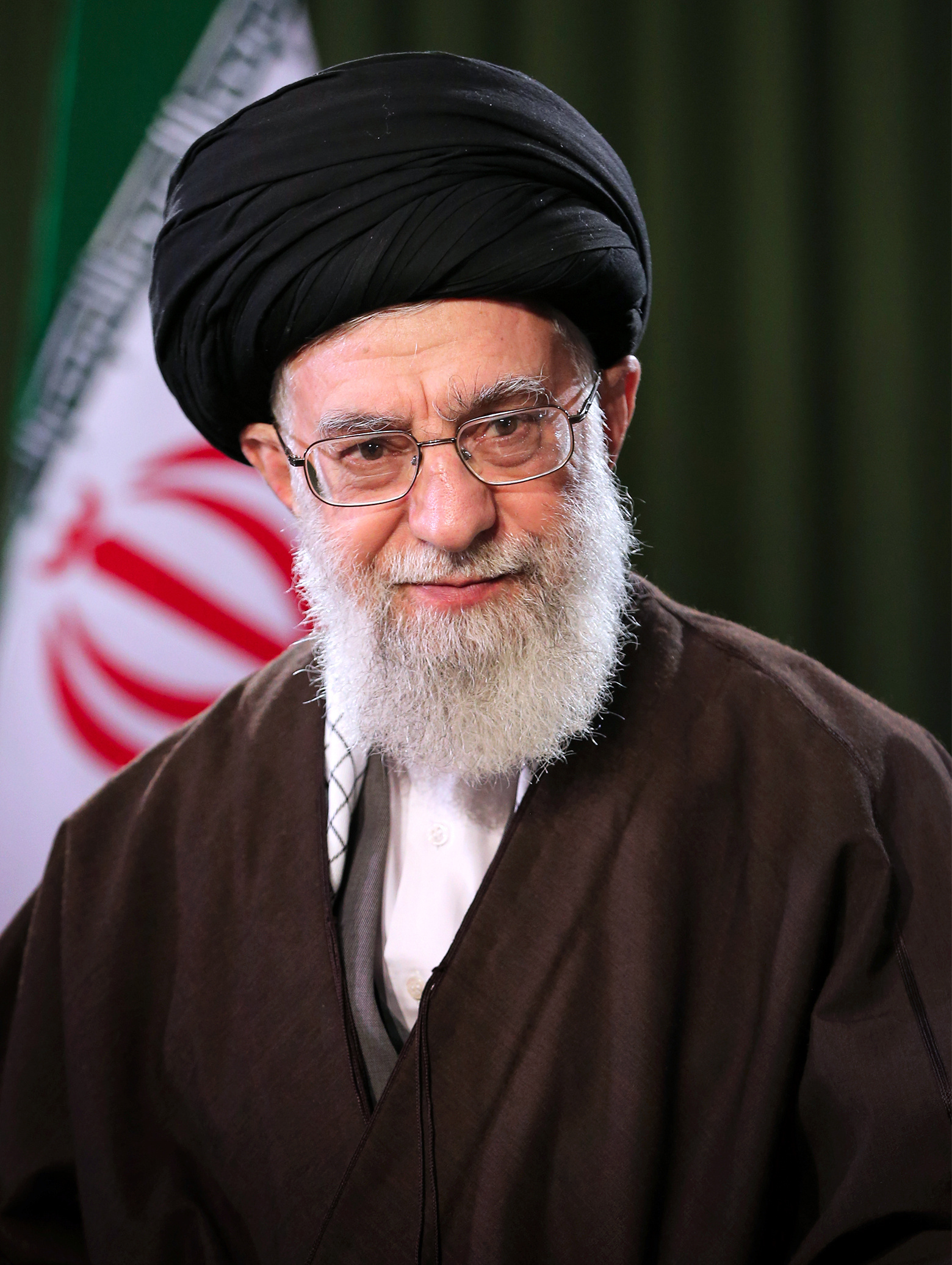
  Ali Khamenei
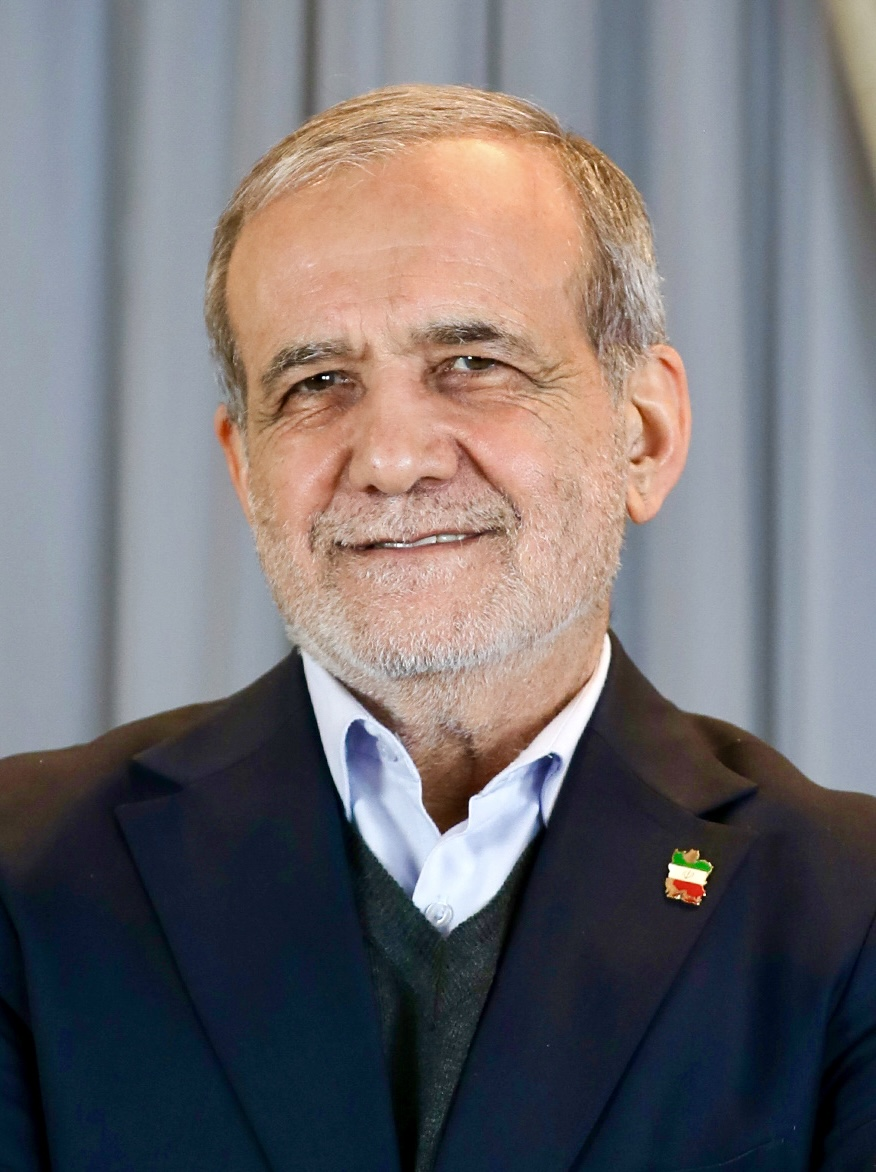
  Masoud Pezeshkian
- Mohsen Mojtahed Shabestari (1937–2021), principilist politician and cleric.
- Asadollah Bayat-Zanjani (born 1941), reformist politician and cleric.
- Reza Moridi (born 1945), Legislative Assembly of Ontario member; Iranian-Canadian.
- Hadi Khamenei (born 1948), reformist politician and cleric; brother of Ali Khamenei.
- Aziz Akbarian (born 1957), principlist politician.
- Nader Ghazipour (born 1958), principlist politician.
- Kamaladin Pirmoazen (born 1959), reformist politician.
- Nouraladin Pirmoazen (born 1959), reformist politician and physician.
- Safar Naeimi (born 1959) principlist politician.
- Mohammad Esmaeili (born 1960), principlist politician.
- Gholam Hossein Shiri Aliabad (1961–2021), politician.
- Shakour Akbarnejad (born 1961), reformist politician.
- Mohammad-Hossein Farhanghi (born 1961) principlist politician.
- Mohammad Esmaeil Saeidi (born 1961), principlist politician.
- Bashir Khaleghi (born 1961), principlist politician.
- Younes Asadi (born 1961), principlist politician.
- Salman Khodadadi (born 1962), principlist politician.
- Mohammad Alipour Rahmati (born 1962), politician.
- Ahmad Hakimipour (born 1963), reformist politician and former militant.
- Arsalan Fathipour (born 1965), principlist politician.
- Zia'ollah Ezazi Maleki (born 1965), politician.
- Gholamreza Nouri Ghezeljeh (born 1970), reformist politician.
- Movayed Hosseini Sadr (born 1970), reformist politician.
- Mohammad Hasannejad (born 1981), politician.

=== Opposition figures and dissidents ===
- Sattar Khan (1866–1914), constitutional revolutionary and nationalist.
- Bagher Khan (1870–1916), constitutional revolutionary and nationalist.
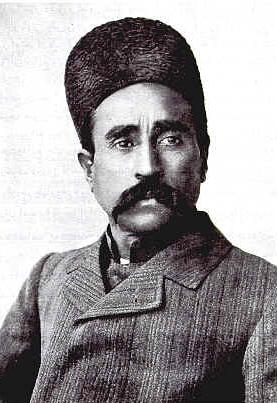
  Sattar Khan
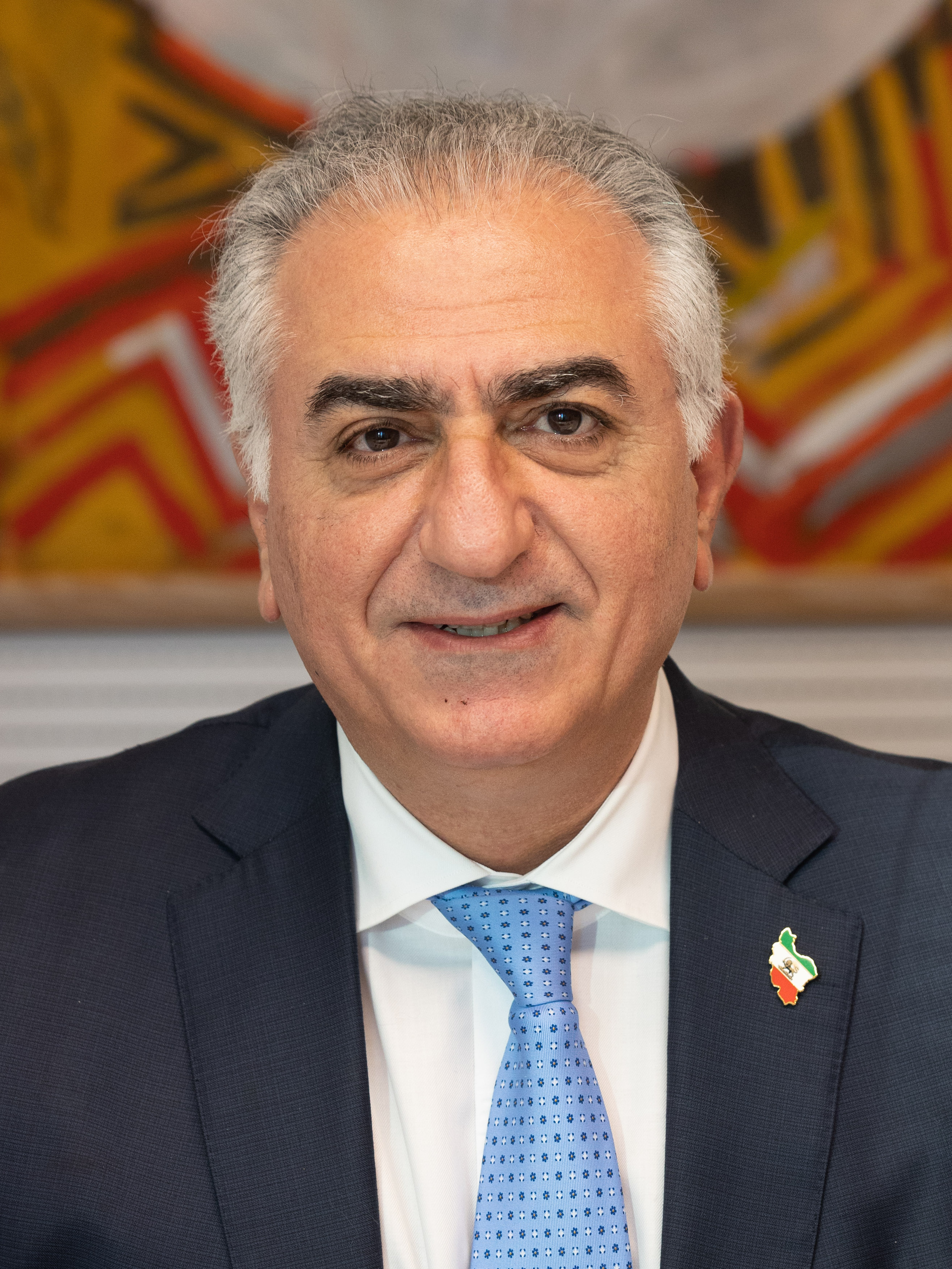
  Reza Pahlavi
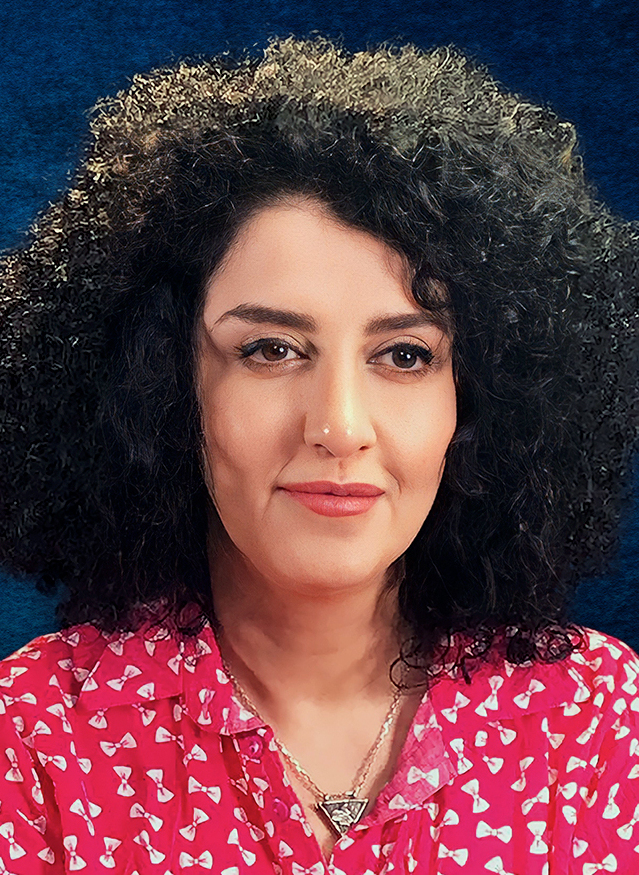
  Narges Mohammadi
- Hossein Ardabili (1880–1918), constitutional activist and writer.
- Haydar Khan Amo'oghli (1880–1921), constitutional revolutionary and left-wing activist.
- Zainab Pasha (c.1884–1921), anti-tobacco activist.
- Rabiollah Kabiri (1889–1947), Azerbaijani Democratic Party separatist.
- Jafar Kavian (1895–1975), Azerbaijani Democratic Party separatist.
- Salamollah Javid (1898–1986), Azerbaijani Democratic Party separatist.
- Khalil Maleki (1901–1969), left-wing nationalist activist.
- Taghi Arani (1903–1940), left-wing activist and founder of the Marxist magazine Donya.
- Nosratollah Jahanshahlou (1913–2012), Azerbaijani Democratic Party separatist.
- Mohammad Biria (1914–1985), Azerbaijani Democratic Party separatist.
- Safar Ghahremani (1921–2002), left-wing activist and ex-political prisoner.
- Razieh Gholami-Shabani (1925–2013), separatist Azerbaijani Democratic Party revolutionary.
- Marzieh Ahmadi (1941–1974), Organization of Iranian People's Fedai Guerrillas member.
- Alireza Nabdel (1944–1971), Organization of Iranian People's Fedai Guerrillas member.
- Hassan Shariatmadari (born 1947), co-founder of the United Republicans of Iran party.
- Maryam Rajavi (born 1954), leader of the People's Mojahedin Organization of Iran (MEK); of Qajar descent.
- Reza Pahlavi (born 1960), opposition leader and exiled crown prince of Iran.
- Narges Mohammadi (born 1972), human rights activist political prisoner, and Nobel Peace Prize winner.
- Saleh Kamrani (born 1972), lawyer and human rights activist; Swedish-Iranian.
- Said Matinpour (born 1976) ethnic rights activist, journalist and ex-political prisoner.
- Alireza Farshi (born 1978), ethnic rights activist.
- Hojat Kalashi (born 1979), activist for the Pan-Iranist Party and ex-political prisoner.
- Hadis Najafi (2000–2022), protestor killed by state forces during the Mahsa Amini protests.
- Asra Panahi (2007–2022), teenager killed by state forces during the Mahsa Amini protests.

== Military ==
- Mohammad-Taghi Pessian (1892–1921), police officer, fighter pilot, and warlord.
- Gholam Yahya Daneshian (1906–2006), commander of the separatist Azerbaijan People's Government Army.
- Abbas Gharabaghi (1918–2000), deputy commander-in-chief of the Imperial State of Iran Armed Forces.
- Javad Fakouri (1938–1981), commander of the Islamic Republic of Iran Air Force and the fourth Minister of Defence of Iran.
- Mehdi Bakeri (1954–1985), commander of the 31st Ashura Division within the Islamic Revolutionary Guard Corps.
- Noureddin Afi (born 1964), soldier in the Iran–Iraq War and memoirist.

== Religion ==
- Elahi Ardabili (c.1475–1543), Shia cleric and theologist.
- Ahmad Mohaghegh Ardabili (c.1500–1585), senior Shia cleric and theologist.
- Rajab Ali Tabrizi (died 1670), Shia cleric and theologist.
- Zeynolabedin Shirvani (1780—1837), Shia cleric and theologist.

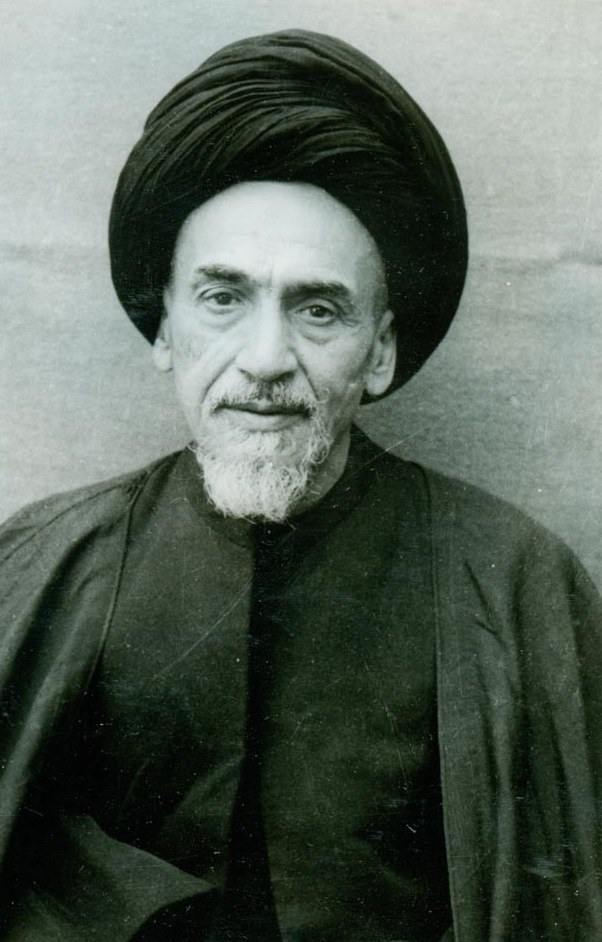
Mohammad Hadi Milani

- Táhirih (1814—1852), theologian, poet, and women's rights activist of the Baháʼí faith.
- Fazil Iravani (1782–1885), Shia cleric.
- Mirza Javad Agha Maleki Tabrizi (1857–1925), Shia cleric and theologist.
- Mirza Ali Agha Tabrizi (1861–1911), Shia cleric and constitutional activist.
- Ali Tabatabaei (1869–1947), Shia cleric and mystic.
- Mohammad-Hojat Kouhkamari (1893–1953), Shia cleric and theologist.
- Mohammad Hadi Milani (1895–1975), senior Shia cleric; Iranian-Iraqi.
- Javad Khamenei (1895–1986), Shia cleric.
- Abolqasem Khoei (1899–1992) senior Shia cleric and theologist; Iranian-Iraqi.

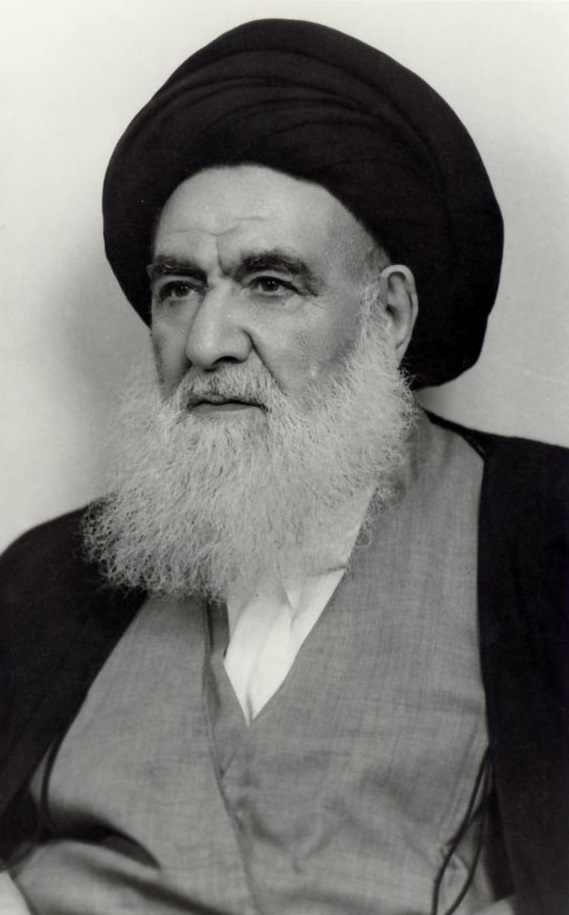
Abolqasem Khoei

- Abdolhossein Amini (1902–1970) Shia cleric and theologist.
- Mohammad Hossein Tabatabaei (1904–1981), Shia cleric and theologist.
- Mohammad Kazem Shariatmadari (1906–1986), senior Shia cleric.
- Mir Asadollah Madani (1914–1981), Shia cleric and politician.
- Mohammad Ali Qazi Tabatabaei (1915–1979), Shia cleric and politician.
- Moslem Malakouti (1924–2014), Shia cleric.
- Ebrahim Musavi Zanjani (1925–1999), Shia cleric and theologist; Iranian-Iraqi.
- Rahim Moazenzadeh Ardabili (1925–2005), Shia muezzin.
- Salim Moazenzadeh Ardabili (1936–2016), Shia muezzin and maddah.
- Mohammad-Taghi Jafari (1923–1998), Shia cleric and theologist.
- Jafar Sobhani (born 1929), senior Shia cleric and theologist.
- Mohammad Mojtahed Shabestari (born 1936), religious philosopher and theologist.
- Abdolrahim Aghighi Bakhshayeshi (1942–2012), Shia cleric and journalist.

== Sports ==
=== Executives and administrators ===
- Ali Fathollahzadeh (born 1959), businessman and football administrator.

=== Individual sports ===
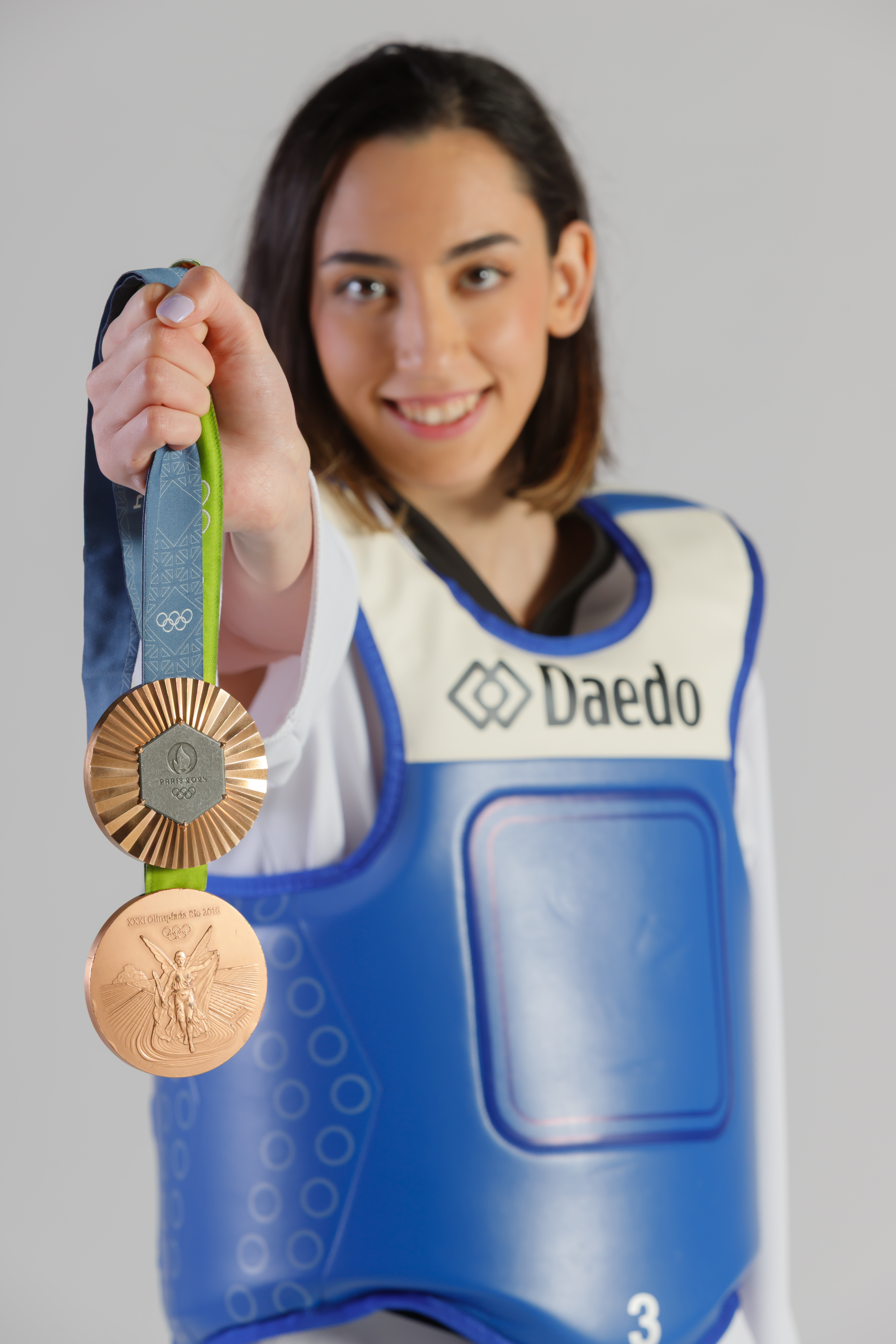
Kimia Alizadeh

==== Combat sports ====
- Hamid Reza Gholipour (born 1988), Wushu and Sanda athlete.

===== Taekwondo =====
- Yousef Karami (born 1983), Olympic Taekwondo athlete.
- Kimia Alizadeh (born 1998), Olympic Taekwondo athlete and defector; naturalized Bulgarian citizen.
- Mirhashem Hosseini (born 1998), Olympic Taekwondo athlete.

===== Wrestling =====
- Gholamreza Takhti (1930–1968), Olympic wrestling gold-medalist.
- Ayoub Baninosrat (born 1968), Olympic wrestler and academic.
- Masoud Hashemzadeh (born 1981), Olympic wrestler.
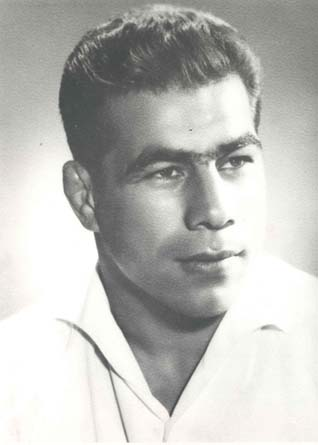
  Gholamreza Takhti
- Saman Tahmasebi (born 1985), wrestler; naturalized Azerbaijani citizen.
- Afshin Biabangard (born 1987), wrestler.
- Parviz Hadi (born 1987), wrestler.

===== Weightlifting =====
- Saeid Azari (born 1968), weightlifter, coach, and football chairman.
- Hossein Rezazadeh (born 1978), Olympic weightlifter and politician.
- Rouhollah Dadashi (1982–2011), weightlifter, bodybuilder and strongman.
- Sajad Anoushiravani (born 1984), weightlifter.
- Saeid Alihosseini (born 1988), weightlifter.

==== Javelin ====
- Hamed Heidari (born 1991), Paralympic javelin thrower.

=== Team sports ===
==== Football ====
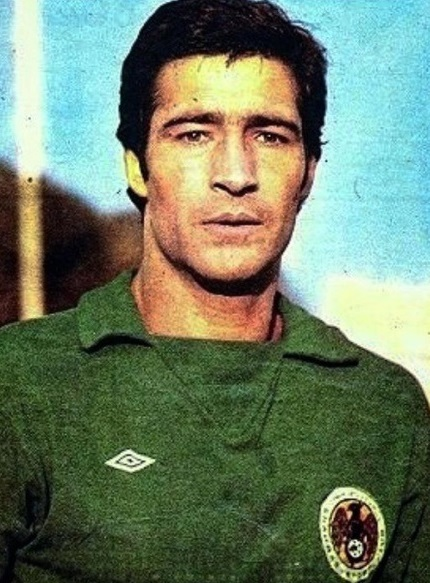
Nasser Hejazi

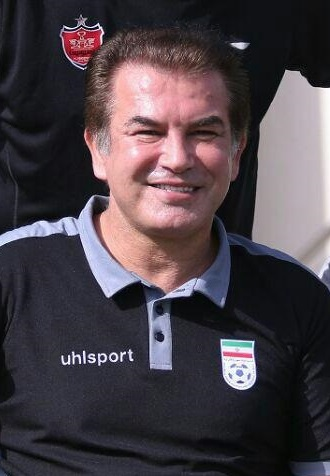
Hamid Estili

- Hossein Sadaghiani (1903–1982), football forward and manager.
- Aziz Asli (1938–2015), football goalkeeper, manager and actor.
- Büyük Vatankhah (born 1942), football defender.
- Nasser Hejazi (born 1949), football goalkeeper and manager.
- Parviz Ghelichkhani (born 1945), football midfielder, journalist, and activist; Iranian-French.
- Reza Vatankhah (born 1947), football defender and manager.
- Nasser Mohammadkhani (born 1957), football forward and manager.
- Farshad Pious (born 1962), football forward.
- Ali Akbar Ostad-Asadi (born 1965), football defender.
- Javad Zarincheh (born 1966), football defender and manager.
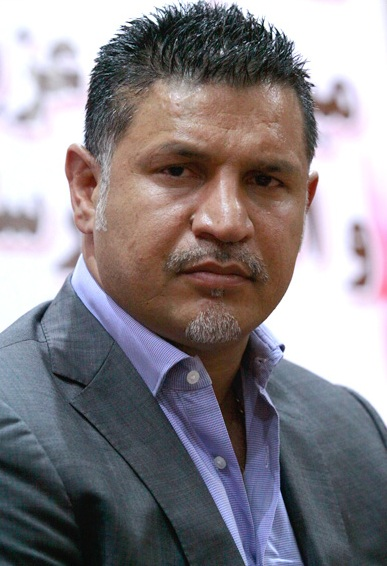
  Ali Daei
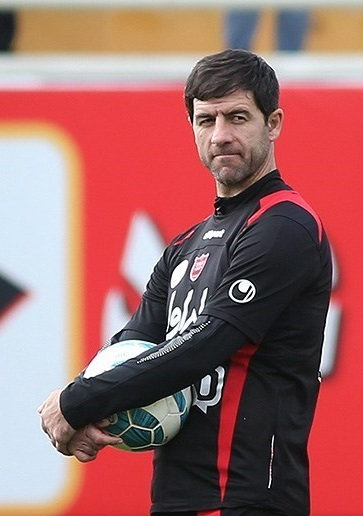
  Karim Bagheri
- Hamid Estili (born 1967) football midfielder and manager.
- Ali Daei (born 1969) football forward, manager, and former captain of the Iran national team.
- Sirous Dinmohammadi (born 1970), football midfielder and manager.
- Payan Rafat (born 1970), football forward and manager.
- Yahya Golmohammadi (born 1971), football defender and manager.
- Saket Elhami (born 1971), football midfielder and manager.
- Mehdi Tartar (born 1972), football midfielder and manager.
- Alireza Akbarpour (born 1973), football midfielder and coach.
- Esmail Halali (born 1973), football midfielder and manager.
- Mehdi Pashazadeh (born 1973), football defender and manager.
- Karim Bagheri (born 1974), football midfielder and coach.
- Sattar Hamedani (born 1974), football midfielder and coach.
- Ali Baghmisheh (born 1975), football forward.
- Younes Bahonar (born 1977), football defender and coach.
- Reza Jabbari (born 1977), retired football midfielder.
- Abbas Aghaei (born 1977), football midfielder and coach.
- Rasoul Khatibi (born 1978), football forward and manager.
- Morteza Asadi (born 1979), football defender and coach.
- Moharram Navidkia (born 1982), football midfielder and manager.
- Mehdi Rahmati (born 1983), football goalkeeper and manager.
- Mojtaba Jabbari (born 1983), football defender and manager.
- Mostafa Ekrami (born 1983), football defender.
- Hashem Beikzadeh (born 1984) football defender and coach.
- Meysam Naghizadeh (born 1986), football midfielder.
- Babak Hatami (born 1986), football defender.
- Jaber Ansari (born 1987), football forward.
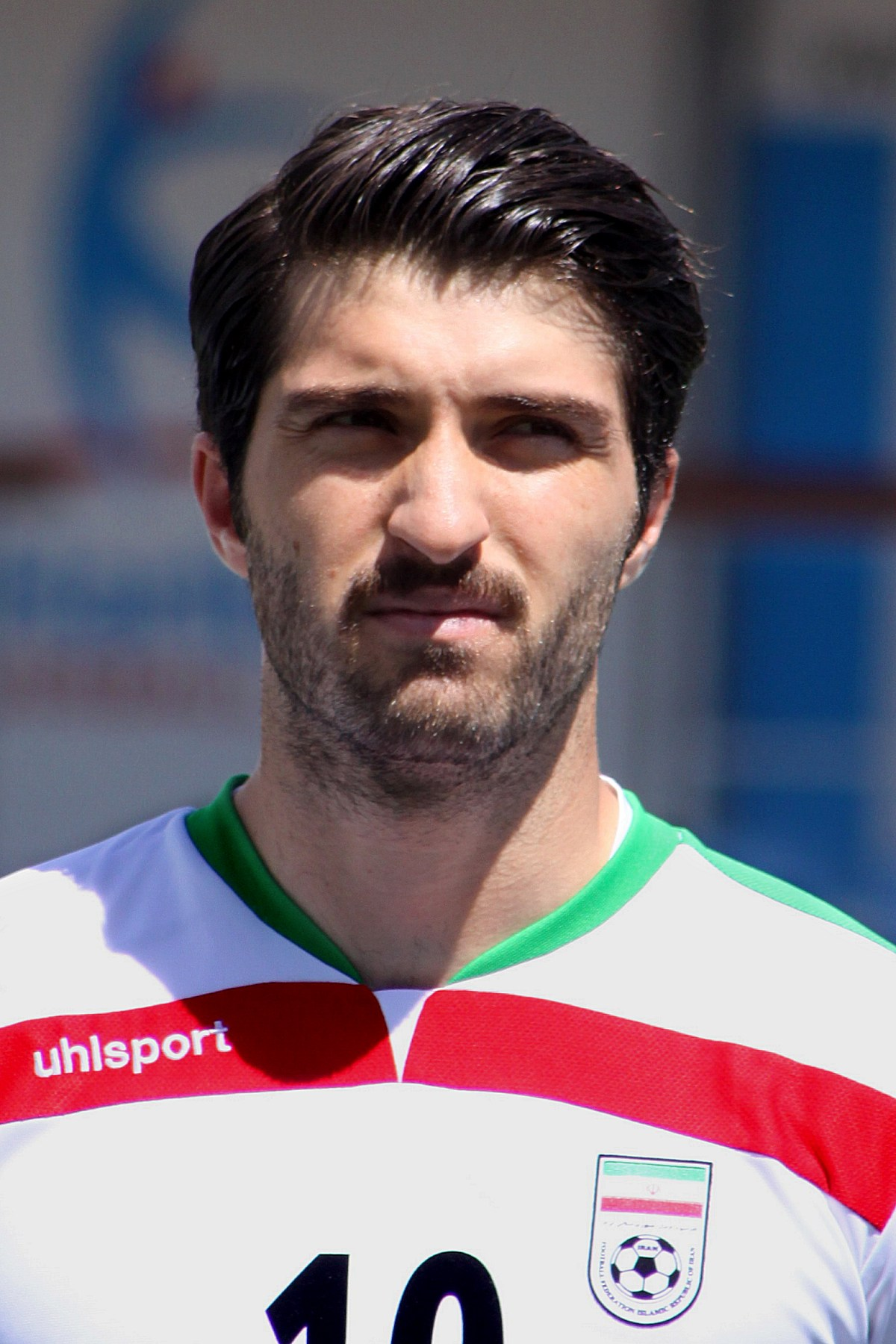
  Karim Ansarifard
- Katayoun Khosrowyar (born 1987), football midfielder and coach; Iranian-American.
- Mohsen Delir (born 1988), football forward.
- Fereshteh Karimi (born 1989), futsal player.
- Karim Ansarifard (born 1990), football forward.
- Ali Ghorbani (born 1990), football forward.
- Saman Nariman Jahan (born 1991), football forward.
- Payam Sadeghian (born 1992), football midfielder.
- Farshad Ahmadzadeh (born 1992), football midfielder.
- Alireza Ramezani (born 1993), football midfielder.
- Arash Rezavand (born 1993), football midfielder.

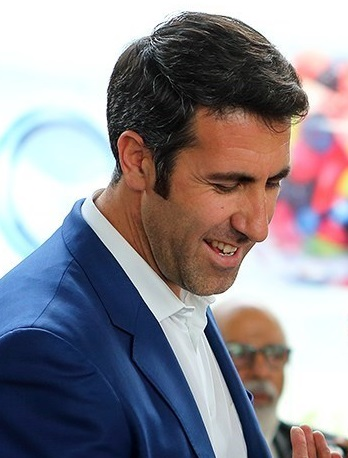
Behnam Mahmoudi

- Shahriyar Moghanlou (born 1994), football forward.
- Saeid Aghaei (born 1995), football forward.

==== Volleyball ====
- Behnam Mahmoudi (born 1980), volleyball opposite spiker and politician.
- Saeid Marouf (born 1985), volleyball setter.
- Arash Keshavarzi (born 1987) volleyball player.
- Shahram Mahmoudi (born 1988), volleyball opposite spiker.
- Pourya Fayazi (born 1993), volleyball outside spiker.
- Milad Ebadipour (born 1993), volleyball outside spiker.
- Bardia Saadat (born 2002), volleyball opposite spiker.

== Miscellaneous ==
- Rizali Khajavi (1931–2017), farmer who became famous for his efforts to prevent a train from hitting oncoming boulders.
- Sakineh Mohammadi Ashtiani (born 1967), gained international attention for being sentenced to death by stoning for charges of murder and adultery until being released in 2014.
- Esmail Jafarzadeh (1975–2017), serial killer.

== See also ==
- List of Iranians
- List of people from Tabriz
- List of Iranian Kurds
