= Alizade =

Alizade is a given name and a surname. Notable people with the name include:

- Alizade (rapper) (Asya Alizade, born 2000), Azerbaijani and Russian singer and songwriter
- Alizade Valida Movsum (born 1946), Azerbaijani doctor
- Asim Alizade (born 2000) is an ,Azerbaijani footballer
- Elchin Alizade (born 1986), Azerbaijani boxer
- Ibrahim Alizade, Kurdish politician
- Mübariz Alizade (1911–1994), Iranian activist
- Salman Alizade (born 1993), Azerbaijani boxer
- Sanan Alizade (1943–2008), Azerbaijani politician
