= Omid Nemati =

Iranian musician (born 1984)

Omid Nemati امید نعمتی
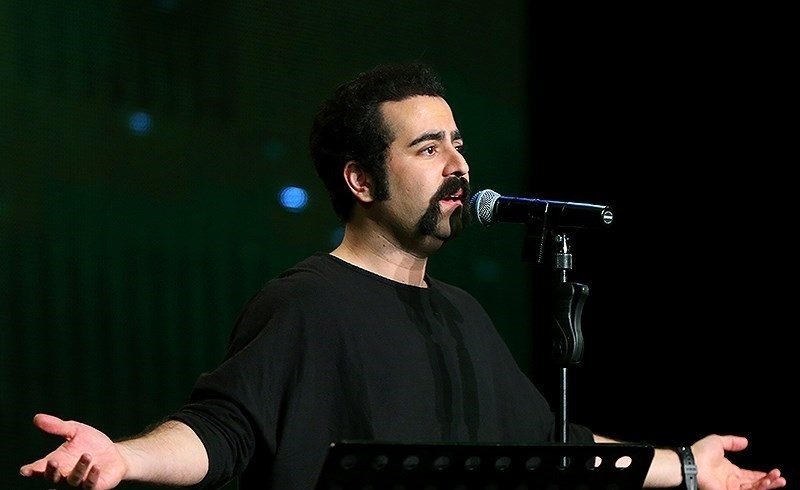
- Nemati performing with Pallett in 2015

Background information
- Born: April 6, 1984 (age 42); Tehran, Iran
- Origin: Iranian
- Genres: Folk Rock; Jazz; Iranian folk music
- Occupations: Musician; Singer; Actor
- Instrument: Vocals
- Years active: 2010–present
- Label: Noufe
- Member of: Pallett
- Formerly of: Dang Show
- Spouse: Shaghayegh Sadeghian (m. 2022)
- Award: Barbad Award

Omid Nemati (Persian: امید نعمتی; born April 6, 1984) is an Iranian singer and composer.

== Personal life ==
Omid Nemati was born in 1984 in Tehran. His father, Akbar Nemati, is a children's book author and illustrator. Omid earned his bachelor's degree in Graphic Design from Soureh University. In January 2022, he married Shaghayegh Sadeghian, the flutist of the Pallett band.

== Pallet ==
Nemati began his musical career by learning traditional Iranian vocal music and initially performed as a singer with the band Dang Show. After leaving Dang Show, he co-founded the band Pallett.

Pallett gained widespread popularity with the release of their debut album Mr. Violet, which brought significant fame to both Nemati and the group. Over more than a decade of activity, Pallett has released three studio albums — Mr. Violet (2012), Tehran, Smile! (2015), and Prime Meridian (2020) — as well as an EP titled Endless Ending (2017) and more than fifteen singles.

Nemati, together with Pallett, has performed concerts in various cities across Iran, as well as tours in Europe and the United States.

== Solo career ==
In addition to his work with Pallett, Nemati has released several solo projects. His most notable solo work is the album Deprivation, a collaboration with Saleh Tasbihi, released in 2018.

== Film and television ==
Nemati appeared in the feature film A Bumpy Story (2021), directed by Kamal Tabrizi. He also served as a judge on the reality show Bandbazi(2021–2022).

== Controversy over a single release ==
A few days before the 2017 Iranian presidential election, Pallett released on Instagram a cover version of the song "Roud" (The River) in support of Hassan Rouhani.

The song, originally written by poet Saeed Soltanpour, who was executed in the early years of the Islamic Republic, was released by the band under the title Old Song (آهنگ قدیمی) without crediting Soltanpour. The release, and its political context, sparked strong criticism from political and cultural activists for both the political endorsement and the lack of attribution. Following the backlash, the band deleted the post and referred to the incident as a "misunderstanding", which in turn drew further criticism.

== Discography ==
=== Studio albums ===
| Released | Title (English) | Title (Persian) | Label | Notes |
|---|---|---|---|---|
| 2020 | Station | ایستگاه | Noufe Records | The songs in this album were composed by Mahyar Alizadeh and feature lyrics from poems by Vahshi Bafghi, Mohammad-Reza Shafiei Kadkani, Alireza Koliaei, Ahoora Ima, and Nemati. |
| 2018 | Deprivation | حرمان | Noufe Records | The songs in this album were composed by Saleh Tasbihi and feature lyrics from poems by Hafez, Hossein Monzavi, Rahi Mo'ayyeri, Rasoul Yunan, Houshang Ebtehaj, Mehdi Akhavan Sales, Nader Naderpour, and Hamid Mosadegh. Additionally, the song Deprivation is based on an old composition by Iraj Amirnezami. |

=== Extended plays ===
| Released | Title (English) | Title (Persian) | Label | Notes |
|---|---|---|---|---|
| 2024 | The Pier of Your Eyes | اسکله‌ی چشمانت | | The songs in this album were composed by Amin Homaei |
| 2020 | Before Autumn, After Autumn | قبلِ پاییز، بعدِ پاییز | | The songs in this album were composed by Amin Homaei |

=== Singles ===
| Released | Title (English) | Title (Persian) | Label | Notes |
|---|---|---|---|---|
| 2023 | "We" | ما | Paygan Productions | Featuring Kabin and Haleh Seyfizadeh |
| 2022 | The Last Friend (Live Version) | آخرین دوست | | Featuring Nowember |
| 2022 | "Khoda Rahm Konad" | خدا رحم کند | | Featuring Amin Homaei |
| 2021 | "Manam" | منم | Zang Records | Featuring Ramin Behna |
| 2018 | "Night till Dawn" | شب تا سحر | | |
| 2018 | "Wanderer on the Streets" | مجنون خیابان‌ها | | |
| 2018 | "Oblivions" | فراموشی‌ها | | This song released as part of the album Deprivation. |
| 2018 | "Distress" | پریشانی | | This song released as part of the album Deprivation. |
| 2016 | "Sarv-e Kharaman" | سرو خرامان | | |

== Awards ==
He received the Barbad Award for Best Pop and Fusion Singer at the 37th Fajr Music Festival for the album Prime Meridian (Pallett Band) in 2022.
