= Hojjat =

Hojjat is a given name. Notable people with the name include:

- Hojjat Adeli, Iranian engineer
- Hojjat Chaharmahali (born 1989), Iranian footballer
- Hojjat Haghverdi (born 1993), Iranian footballer
- Hojjat Kalashi, Iranian politician
- Hojjat Nazari (born 1988), Iranian politician
- Hojjat Sedghi (born 1993), Iranian footballer
- Hojjat Shakiba (born 1949), Iranian painter
- Ali Hojjat Kashani (1919–1979), Iranian military officer
- Seyyed Mohammad Hojjat Kooh Kamari (1893–1953), Iranian religious leader
