= Ja'far Modarres-Sadeghi =

Iranian novelist and editor (born 1954)

Jaafar Modarres-Sadeghi
- جعفر مدرس صادقی
- Born: May 19, 1954 (age 72); Isfahan
- Occupations: Novelist and editor
- Years active: 1973–present

Jaafar Modarres-Sadeghi (Persian: جعفر مدرس صادقی; born May 19, 1954) is an Iranian novelist and editor.

== Life ==
Modarres-Sadeghi was born in Isfahan and moved to Tehran in 1972. While he was studying in the College of Literature and Foreign Languages in Tehran, he began to work as a journalist in a few dailies and literary magazines, writing reports, reviews and weekly columns. His first short story appeared in a literary monthly, Roudaki, in 1973. His first collection of stories, Children Don't Play Anymore, was published in 1977. His first novel, A Play, was published in 1980. The publication of this first novel coincided with the outbreak of Iran–Iraq War and was neglected by audience and critics.

Modarres-Sadeghi's second novel, Gavkhooni (The River's End), published in 1983, was acclaimed as an avant-garde literary masterpiece a few years after its publication. It was translated into English in 1996, and was awarded a prize as one of the best novels of post-revolution era in 1998. A movie based on the novel, directed by Behrooz Afkhami, and produced by Ali Moallem, was made in 2003. It was shown in the Cannes International Film Festival, May 2004, in Directors' Fortnight section, and later in the 2004 Vancouver International Film Festival and a few other international film festivals in Asia.

Modarres-Sadeghi has published six collections of short stories and seventeen novels. His latest novel, Behesht o Douzakh, was published in 2016.

== Short stories ==
- 1977 Bacheha Bazi Nemikonand (The Kids Are Not Playing)
- 1985 Ghesmate Digaran (The Others' Lot and Other Stories)
- 1991 Twelve Stories
- 1998 Kenare Darya, Morakhasi va Azadi (The Seaside, The Leave and The Release)
- 2002 Antarafe Khiaban (The Other Side of the Street)
- 2007 Vaghaye'e Ettefaghyyeh (Something Happened)

== Novels ==
- 1980 A Play
- 1983 Gavkhooni
- 1989 Safare Kasra (Kasra's Journey)
- 1989 Balone Mahta (Mahta's Balloon)
- 1990 Nakoja-Abad (Nowhere-ville)
- 1991 Kalleye Asb (The Horse's Head)
- 1993 Sharike Jorm (The Accomplice)
- 1997 Arze Hal (A Petition)
- 1999 Shah Kelid (The Master Key)
- 2001 Man Ta Sobh Bidaram (I’m Staying Up till Dawn)
- 2005 Abo o Khak (Homeland)
- 2008 Bijan o Manijeh
- 2009 Toope Shabaneh (The Nightly Gun)
- 2014 Khaterate Ordibehesht (The Reminiscences of May)
- 2014 Rouznameh Nevis (The Journalist)
- 2015 Kafe'ee Kenare Aab (A Café on the Beach)
- 2016 Behesht o Douzakh (Paradiso and Inferno)

== Edited ==
- 1994 Tabari's Commentary on the Qur'an
- 1994 Discourses of Mowlana Jalaloddin Rumi
- 1994 Discourses of Shamsoddin Muhammad Tabrizi
- 1994 A History of Sistan
- 1995 A Persian Translation of the Life of Muhammad by Ibn Ishaq
- 1996 The Book of the Marvels
- 1996 Eight Mystic Treatises by Shihaboddin Yahya Suhrawardi
- 1998 Baihaqi's History
- 2000 The Adventures of Hajji Baba of Ispahan (a new edition of Mirza Habib's Persian translation of James Morier's novel)
- 2002 Atiq's Commentary on the Qur'an
- 2002 Sadegh Hedayat, the Short Story Writer (a selection of Hedayat's short stories)

== Translation ==
- 1992 Lottery, Chekhov and Other Stories (seven short stories by Shirley Jackson, Anne Tyler, Ann Beattie, John Updike, Raymond Carver, Tobias Wolff & Kazuo Ishiguro)

== Translated into English ==
- The Marsh [Gavkhooni] (1996) translated from the Persian by Afkham Darbandi. Introduction by Dick Davis. Mazda Publishers, Costa Mesa, California
- Horse’s Head (2011)Horse's Head: A Novel by Jaafar Modarres-Sadeghi (2011)

== Translated into Turkish ==
- At Kafasi [The Horse's Head], Cafer Modarres Sadiqi. Farscadan Ceviren Siyaves Azeri. Avesta Yayinlari, Istanbul, 2001.
- Ben Sabaha Kadar Uyanigim, Cafer Modarres Sadeghi. Ceviren: Maral Jefroudi. Metis Yayincilik Ltd., 2007.
