= Ahrab =

Coordinates: 38°04′N 46°16′E

Ahrab is a historic and ancient municipal district in central part of Tabriz, East Azerbaijan, Iran.Company House, one of the historical houses of Tabriz is located in this district.

== Notable people from Ahrab ==
- Mahmud Shaterian, a famous Azerbaijani composer and musician
- Huseyn Khundel, an Azerbaijani poet

== General References ==
- Ahrab
