= Marzieh Ahmadi =

Iranian revolutionary, poet and teacher

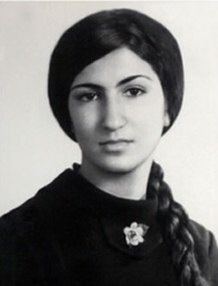
- A portrait of Marzieh Ahmadi
- Born: 1941; Osku, Iran
- Died: April 26, 1974 (aged 32–33); Tehran, Iran

Marzieh Ahmadi or Uskulu Marziyya (1941, Osku, East Azerbaijan Province – 1974, Tehran) was an Iranian poet, teacher, revolutionary, and a prominent female member of the resistance movement against the regime of the Shah. She was a member of the Organization of Iranian People's Fedai Guerrillas. She died in a shootout with SAVAK in 1974.

== Political life ==
Marzieh Ahmadi was born in 1941 in the city of Osku. After graduating from high school, she entered Tabriz Pedagogical College. After graduation she began working as a teacher in the primary schools of Osku district.

She entered Tabriz University three years later. While continuing her education, she did not abandon her pedagogical activities. She tried to create "mobile libraries" for rural schools by visiting them. She published her first poem under the nickname "Dalga". She translated all her works written in Persian into Turkish (Azerbaijani), and all her works written in her native language into Persian.

Ahmadi, who led the student protests in 1970, getting the attention of the intelligence agency SAVAK, was arrested and exiled to Osku. Later she wrote her memoirs about these days. As a member of the Organization of Iranian People's Fedai Guerrillas, she received information about SAVAK officers who heard about the meeting of two members of the group on April 26, 1974, and went bravely for her friends' rescue. Although she reached the meeting place and warned her friends, it was too late. Her friend was followed and arrested in a nearby bus stop. Ahmadi, planning to hide in a house rented by OIPGF, was followed and surrounded by police. Ahmadi left her hiding and attacked SAVAK. The shooting started and she was killed in an armed clash with SAVAK.

She was buried with close friends Behruz Dehghani and Alirza Nabdil in the 33rd corner of the Beheshti-Zahra graveyard in Tehran.

== In mass culture ==
Bakhtiyar Vahabzadeh dedicated the poem "Marziya" to Uskulu Marziya.

In 2014, photographer Azadeh Akhlaghi revived the deaths in Iranian history with her photos. She staged the death of Mohammadtaghi khan Pusyan, Ali Shariati and others, as well as Uskulu Marziya.

== See also ==
- Samad Behrangi
- Alireza Nabdel
- Ashraf Dehghani
