= Saleh Kamrani =

Iranian-Swedish lawyer, human rights defender, and politician

- Born: December 31, 1972 (age 53); Ahar, East Azerbaijan, Iran
- Citizenship: Swedish/Iranian
- Education: Shiraz University
- Occupations: lawyer, human rights defender
- Political party: Azerbaijan Central Party
- Spouse: Maryam Faroughy Qajar

Saleh Kamrani (Persian: صالح کامرانی, Azerbaijani: صالح کامرانی/Saleh Kamrani; born 1972) is an Iranian-Swedish human rights lawyer, lobbyist, and politician of Iranian Azerbaijani origin. He is regarded as prisoner of conscience by Amnesty International. Kamrani defended Iranian politicians and activists like Mohsen Sazegara, Yousef Azizi Bani-Torof and many others. He was repeatedly threatened for his activities and persecuted by Iranian security services and was abducted in 2006. He was sentenced to one year in prison, and after serving his sentence, he was forced to flee Iran, and move to Sweden, where he founded the Azerbaijan Central Party and AzNews TV (ANT), the most influential TV channel of northwestern Iran gathering 50 million viewers a month .

== Early life ==
Saleh Kamrani was born on 31 December 1972, in the city of Ahar, East Azerbaijan of Iran, in an Iranian Azerbaijani family. After graduating from high school, he entered the law faculty of Shiraz University. While studying there, Kamrani began to conduct Azerbaijani language and literature courses in the university's dormitory. Kamrani also received a master's degree from Shiraz University.

== Career and political activities ==
Kamrani began his career after completing his military service. He participated in the establishment of the Shiraz University Turkic Language Students Association and the editor-in-chief of the Azerbaijani and Persian-language newspaper Savalan. Kamrani later represented a number of Iranian Azerbaijani activists who were detained in connection with their political or cultural activities, including Gholam Reza Amani, Abbas Lisani, Hamid Iman, Seyyed Javad Mousavi, Hidayat Zakir, Maharam Kamrani, Ibrahim Savalan, Saleh Molla Abbasi, Javad Abbas, and Abbas Nik Ravan, defending them in the court as their lawyers. He also defended Iranian politicians like Mohsen Sazegara, and also the Ahwazi Arabs activists, including Yousef Azizi Bani-Torof.

Kamrani was repeatedly threatened for his activities and persecuted by Iranian security services. He went to Urmia in 2005 with his brother, Maharam Kamrani, the founder of the Azerbaijani-language student newspapers Bakhish and Oyanish, to defend another activist in court. In the middle of the night, the Iranian security services raided his house, detaining him and his brother. Although they were released a few days later, his brother was later detained again. After the violent suppression of Iranian Azerbaijani protesters over the cockroach controversy in 2006 and the deaths of dozens of protesters, Kamrani formed a group called the Committee to Protect National Rights and began giving interviews to various international television and radio stations. He was then abducted by the Iranian security services on 14 June 2006, on his way home from Tehran. Although his whereabouts were unknown for several days, it was later revealed that he was being held in Evin Prison. This was confirmed on 19 June by his family members. Although he was released in 2007, he was again detained on 18 August of that year and sentenced to one year in prison. After his release, he was forced to flee the country again because of persecution and threats. He left the country in 2010 and moved to Sweden. There, he began giving interviews to a number of international channels as an independent expert, and founded the Azerbaijan Central Party and AnT TV.
