= Alizade (rapper) =

Azerbaijani-Russian rapper (born 2003)

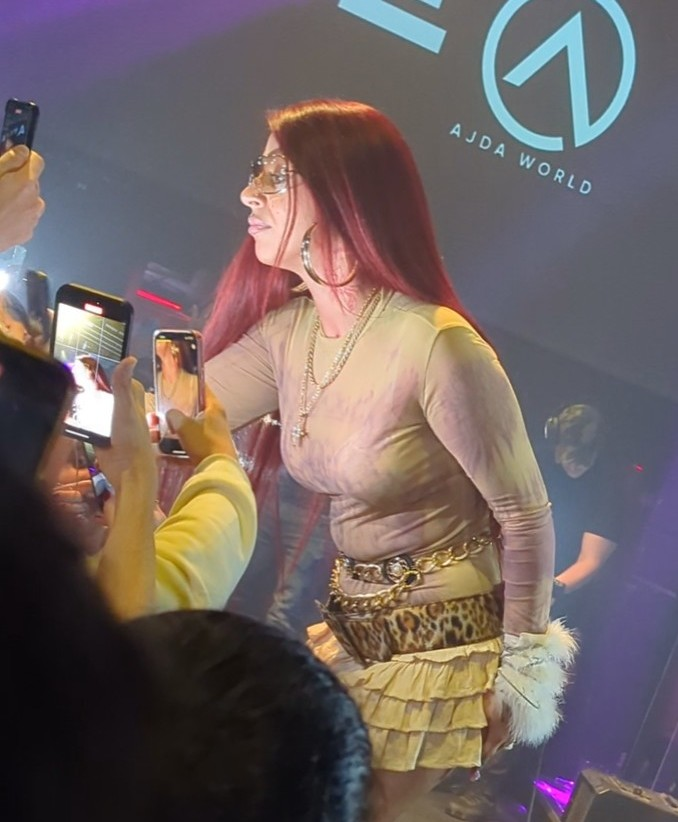
- Alizade in September 2024

Background information
- Born: Asya Tariyel qizi Alizade; 28 October 2000 (age 26); Nakhchivan, Azerbaijan
- Genre: Hip-hop
- Occupations: Rapper; singer; songwriter
- Label: Gülbaba Music
- Publisher: Immigrant Music

Asya Alizade (Azerbaijani: Asya Tariyel qızı Əlizadə; born 28 October 2000), known mononymously as Alizade (Əlizadə), is an Azerbaijani and Russian rapper, singer and songwriter.

== Early life and education ==
Alizade was born on 28 October 2000 in Nakhchivan, Azerbaijan. At the age of 11, she moved with her parents to Moscow, the capital of Russia. Since childhood, Alizade was interested in music, so she went to music school. After entering the Moscow University for the Humanities, she continued to study music, performing at student events.

== Career ==
Alizade began her musical career in 2019, signing a contract with Warner Music Russia and collaborating with the rapper Big Baby Tape.

Her debut EP, titled Molly Mo Music, was made available for consumption starting in August 2021. Following the Russian invasion of Ukraine in 2022, she left Russia to settle in Turkey.

In March 2023, Alizade's first studio album Latin Virgin was released. Previously, she released "Anormal", her first single to debut on the Turkey Songs chart, climbing to number 20.

"Kalbin bana kaldı" (2022), in collaboration with Bege, reached number 15 on the Turkish Billboard charts. "24/7" ( 2023), again in collaboration with the same artist, reached number 2 on the charts.

In February 2025, Alizade returned to the music scene with "Kahpe", a duet with Lvbel C5 and Akdo, as well as her second single to enter the top ten of Turkey Songs.

== Discography ==
=== Studio albums ===
- 2026 — Rahat Music

=== Extended plays ===
- 2021 — Molly Mo Music
- 2023 — Latin Virgin

=== Singles ===
- 2019 – Make Up
- 2019 – Gucci (feat. Big Baby Tape)
- 2020 – Moon
- 2021 – Mudak
- 2021 – Carousel
- 2021 – Korol '
- 2022 – Kalbin bana kaldı (with Bege)
- 2022 – Anormal
- 2022 – Beynimi siktin
- 2022 – Hapisane
- 2023 – Estafurla
- 2023 – Piç Böcek
- 2023 – 24/7 (with Bege)
- 2023 – Balenciaga
- 2023 – Baby naber?
- 2023 – Trip attım
- 2023 – Kedi gibiyim
- 2024 – Special
- 2024 – Tantuni
- 2025 – Kahpe (with Lvbel C5 and Akdo)
- 2026 – Stop Smoking
- 2026 – IMMIGRANT
