= Nouraddin Afi =

Iranian veteran

Seyyed Noureddin Afi
- Persian: سيد نورالدين عافي
- Born: 1964 (age 61–62); Tabriz, Iran
- Occupation: Author
- Writing career
- Language: Azerbaijani
- Notable work: "Noureddin, Son of Iran"

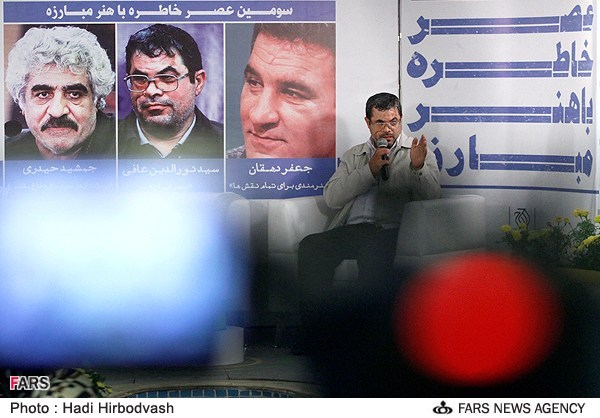

Seyyed Noureddin Afi (Persian: سيد نورالدين عافي) is a veteran who participated in the Iran–Iraq War for 80 months. He was born in 1964 in Khelejan in the Central District of Tabriz County, East Azerbaijan Province, Iran. He has written about his war memoirs in a book called Noureddin, Son of Iran, presented as a book by Masoume Sepehri. The book was published in 2011. Ayatollah Ali Khamenei wrote a manuscript in appreciation of Noureddin's book.

== Life and career ==
Seyyed Noureddin Afi was born in 1964 in Khelejan, in the Central District of Tabriz County, East Azerbaijan Province, Iran. He wanted to participate the Iran–Iraq War, but he was not allowed at first because he was still young. Noureddin tried repeatedly and eventually he was allowed to go to war. He attended a military training course in the fall of 1980 and traveled to the western zones of Iran to serve in the Sepah of the Mehabad. He moved to the southern war zones along with his brother, Sadegh. Sadegh then died in an Iraqi airstrike, while Noureddin was severely injured. With shrapnel in his body, he went under surgery in hospitals in Mashhad in Kermanshah many times. However, he did not recover well due to severe damage in the face, eyes and stomach. Due to his severe injuries, his facial features permanently changed. In 1984, he married a 16-year-old girl named Masoume and their child was born 4 years later.

== Awards ==
Noureddin's book, Noureddin, Son of Iran won in the "Memoir" category of the Jalal Al-e Ahmad Literary Awards. (2012)
