= Mohammadreza Bayrami =

Iranian writer and novelist

Mohammadreza bayrami
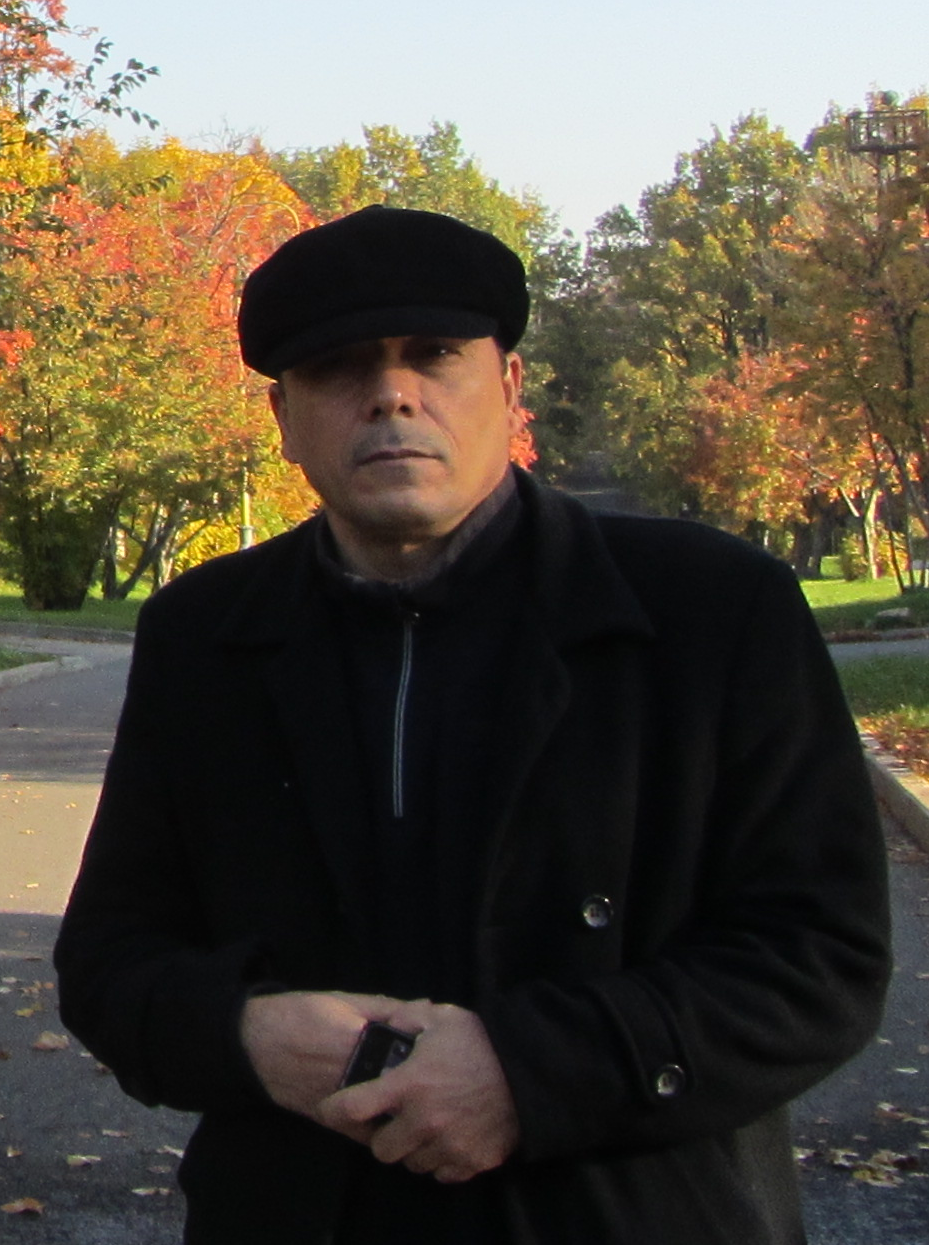
- Born: 1965; Ardabil, Iran
- Occupation: Writer, novelist

Mohammadreza Bayrami (Persian: محمدرضا بایرامی, born 1961 in Ardabil) – is an Iranian Azerbaijani writer of Persian literature whose main forms of writing are the Dastan and the novel. He won Badge Golden Safavid in Iran for promoting Persian Language and Literature.

== Early life ==
In 1965, Bayrami was born near the Sabalan mountain in Ardabil, Azerbaijan province, Iran, and emigrated with his parents to Tehran & Karaj in 1962, where he is currently living. In 1987, he became a conscript soldier for the Iranian army and served his country in the war with Iraq.

== Influenced by ==
- Samad Behrangi
- Ali Ashraf Darvishian

== Works ==
- The Mountain Called Me
- Hello Stone
- The Tales of Sabalan
- Djalal reitet um sein Leben
- The Edge of the Cliff
- Line of contact
