= Azerbaijani population by country =

Azerbaijani populations exist throughout the world. About 8.2 million Azerbaijanis live in Azerbaijan (2009 census), making 91.6% of the country's population. According to the CIA website, Azerbaijanis are the second ethnic group in Georgia (6.3% in 2014) and in Iran.

== Most recent data ==
Country
Country	Official estimate	Official estimate year	Low estimate	High estimate	Regional Azerbaijanis	Sub-ethnic groups (historical numbers)	Reference
World			30,000,000	50,000,000			
Iran (article)			17,000,000	35,000.000	Iranian Azerbaijanis	300,000 Afshars, 300,000 Qajars, 300,000 Shahsevans, 75,000-80,000 Karadaghis, 30,000 Qarapapaqs	
Azerbaijan	10,180,770	2024	10,180,770	10,180,770	396,709 Nakhchivan Azerbaijanis, 248,000 Iranian Azerbaijanis, 150,000-250,000 Armenian Azerbaijanis, 40,000 Nagorno-Karabakh Azerbaijanis		
Russia (article) (Note: Including Temporary Population)	603,070	2010	1,500,000	3,000,000	38,523 Derbent Azerbaijanis		
Turkey (article)			530,800	3,000,000	Kars and Ighdir Azerbaijanis, 300,000 citizens of Azerbaijan Republic	60,000-70,000 Qarapapaqs	
Georgia (article)	233,024	2014	233,024	360,000			
Kazakhstan (article)	96,931	2009	85,292	150,000			
United States (article)	54,205	2008	54,605	400,000	14,205 Azerbaijanis from Republic of Azerbaijan; 40,400 Iranian Azerbaijanis		
Ukraine (article)	45,176	2001	45,176	45,176			
Uzbekistan (article)	35,848	2000	35,848	35,848			
Turkmenistan (article)	33,365	1989	33,365	50,000			
Kyrgyzstan (article)	21,389	2021					
Germany (article)			15,219	200,000			
Netherlands			18,000	18,000			
United Arab Emirates	7,000	2015					
United Kingdom (article)	6,220	2013	6,220	15,000			
Belarus (article)	5,567	2009	5,567	5,567			
Canada (article)	4,580	2011	4,580	80,000			
Sweden	2,935		2,935	2,935			
Latvia	1,697	2001	1,697	1,697			
France (article)			1,112	70,000			
Austria	1,000						
Estonia	880	2000					
Tajikistan	800	2000					
Lithuania	788						
Australia	300						
Italy	552						
Denmark	231						
Armenia (article)	no data available						
