= Alizade Valida Movsum =

Azerbaijani doctor of biological sciences

Valida Alizadeh
- Born: 31 January 1946 (age 80); Baku, Azerbaijan
- Awards: Individual grant of ISF (1993) Honorary degree of Azerbaijan National Academy of Sciences (2007) Order of Glory by the Decree of the President of the Republic of Azerbaijan (2015)

Alizade Valida Movsum gizi (Azerbaijani: Əlizadə Validə Mövsüm qızı; January 31, 1946) is an Azerbaijani doctor of biological sciences, professor, full member (academician) of Azerbaijan National Academy of Sciences (ANAS) and the director of the Institute of Botany ANAS.

== Career ==
She was born in Baku in 1946 and graduated in 1968 in biology from Azerbaijan State University.

Valida Alizade studied cellular and molecular mechanisms of plant resistance to aluminum and heavy metals. She determined the role of some plant species from local flora in bioindication and remediation of environmental contamination. She worked under multiple NATO linkage collaborative research grants.

She focused on the formation of plants under environmental stress factor conditions, cellular and molecular mechanisms of plant stability, and problems of plant physiological ecology such as the role of some species of local flora in the bioindication and remediation of contamination in the environment.

She was the editor responsible for the 2nd edition of the Red Book of Rare and Endangered Plant and Fungi of Azerbaijan (2013). She is the author of the Azerbaijani section of Red List of the Endemic Plants of the Caucasus, (2013, English). It was the first time that the status of populations of rare species included in the Red Book was comprehensively studied. For this, special monitoring systems were prepared, and a dynamic database was created. She studied the future dynamics of several sensitive plant species in danger of extinction via the application of mathematical modeling. She pioneered new approaches to population ontogenesis, ethnobotanics, phytosociology, and biodiversity informatics at the Institute of Botany.

== Selected works ==
- Ali-zade V.M., Shirvani T.S., Schmohl N., Alirzayeva E.G., Annagiyeva M.A., Fecht M. and Horst W.J. Changes in protein content and protease activity in roots of Zea mays (L.) in response to short-term aluminium treatment. Plant nutrition: food security and sustainability of agro-ecosystems through basis and applied research. Kluwer Acad. Publ. Eds. W.J. Horst et al., 2001, v.92, p. 518-520.
- Alirzayeva E.G., Shirvani T.S., Alverdiyeva S., Yazici M.A., Ali-zade V.M., Cakmak I. Heavy metal accumulation in Artemisia and foliaceous lichen species from the Azerbaijan flora. Forest, Snow and Landscape Res. Switzerland, 2006, v. 80, N 3, p. 339-348.
- Hajiyev V.J., Musayev S.H., Ali-zade V.M., Abdiyeva R.T. Disputable endemic species of Azerbaijan flora. Proceedings of Azerbaijan National Academy of Sciences. Biological sciences. 2008, No. 5-6. p. 8-12
- Musayev S.H., Ali-zade, V.M. Abdiyeva R.T. Biodiversity, assessment and conservation of national endemics of Azerbaijan. Proceedings of Azerbaijan National Academy of Sciences. Biological Sciences. 2009, No. 1-2, p. 10-17.
- Schatz G., Shulkina T., Nakhutsrishvili G., Batsatsashvili K., Ali-zade V., Kikodze D., Geltman D., Ekim T. Development of Plant Red List Assessments for the Caucasus Biodiversity Hotspot. "Status and protection of globally threatened species in the Caucasus" Eds. N. Zazanashvili and David Mallon, Tbilisi: CEPF, WWF, 2009, p. 188-192
- Ali-zade V., Alirzayeva E., Shirvani T. Plant resistance to anthropogenic toxicants: approaches to phytoremediation. "Plant adaptation and Phytoremediation" Eds: M.Ashref, M.Ozturk and M.S.A.Ahmad Springer, 2010, XII, Chapter 9, p. 173-192.
- Alirzayeva E., Ali-zade V., Shirvani T., Roemheld V., Cakmak I. Genetic capacity of some medicinal plants to accumulate heavy metals. Eds, A.Ahmad, T.O.Siddiqi, M.Iqbal. Medicinal plants in Changing Environment. Capital Publ. Company, New Delhi, India, 2010, Chapter 6, p. 89-114.

== Memberships ==
- Society of Plant Physiologists of Russia and Azerbaijan
- Azerbaijan Society of Biophysicists
- Botanical Society of Azerbaijan
- Federation of European Societies of Plant Biologists
- UNESCO National Committee on Bioethics and Ethics of Science and Technology in Azerbaijan
- Society of Russian Plant Physiologists
- Society of Azerbaijanian Plant Physiologists
- Society of Azerbaijanian Biophysists
- FEPBS
- Azerbaijan National Committee on Bioetics, Science, and Technology
- Bureau of the Department of Biological and Medical Sciences of ANAS

== Awards and prizes ==
- Individual grant of ISF (1993)
- Honorary degree of Azerbaijan National Academy of Sciences (2007)
- Order of Glory by the Decree of the President of the Republic of Azerbaijan (2015)
