= Dang Show =

Iranian musical group

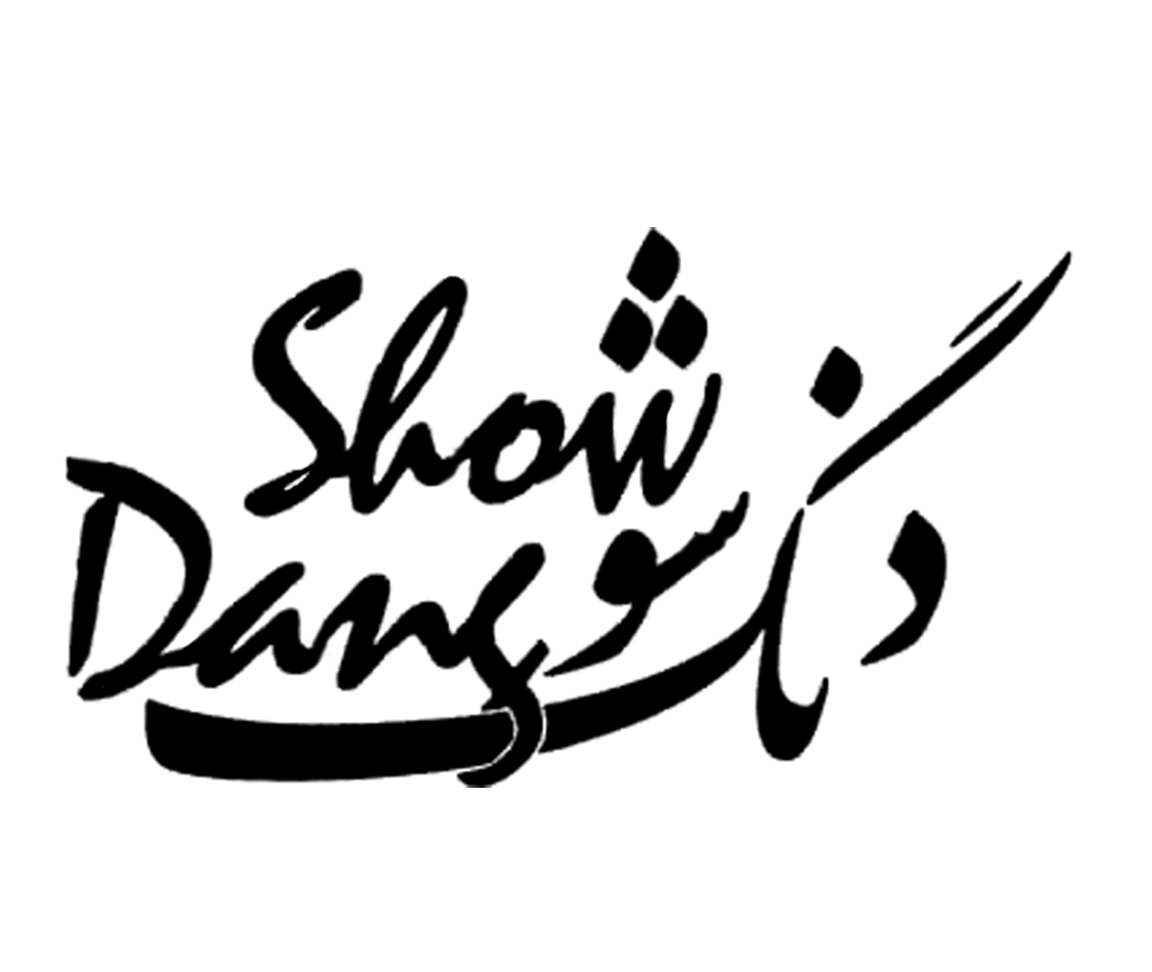

Dang Show is an Iranian music band formed in 2007 by two brothers: Taha Parsa, and Shaya Shoja. According to Taha Parsa, they consider their genre to be called “New Age Folklore”. The name “Dang Show” stems in a poem by Mowlana and means “give up your wisdom, according to the band members.

The iranian band Dang Show could be defined as "a fusion of Iranian classical and jazz.”. In 2018 it was awarded Best Fusion Album for Mad O Nay in Iran.

== Instruments ==
Instruments such as saxophone, Tonbak (Persian instrument), piano, cello, and bass are often used in their music.

== Performances ==
Since 2007 they have had numerous performances in Iran, United States, Canada, United Kingdom, Thailand, and Bosnia and Herzegovina. Recent performances are Based on Toronto, Canada. Dang show started having the first woman vocal artist in their shows and performances, Mahnaz Rad since 2019.

== Members ==
Since 2007, Taha Parsa (vocal and saxophone), Reza Shaya (piano), and Saba Samimi (tonbak) have been the permanent members. Other temporary members include Sepanta Mojtahedzadeh (vocal), Omid Nemati (vocal), Ali Zand Vakili (vocal), Milad Bagheri (vocal), Mahnaz Rad (Vocal), Milad Ghaleh (Guitar Electronic) Khashayar Ravangar (drums), Aidin Tarkian (kamancheh), Kasra Saboktakin (bass), Makan Khoinejad (cello), and so on.

== Albums ==
Year	Album	Notes
2010	40 Year Old Shiraz	
2013	Deltang Show	
2014	Dang Show Room	
2017	Mad o Nay	
2019	Shiraz	Spotify
