= Hojjat Shakiba =

Iranian painter

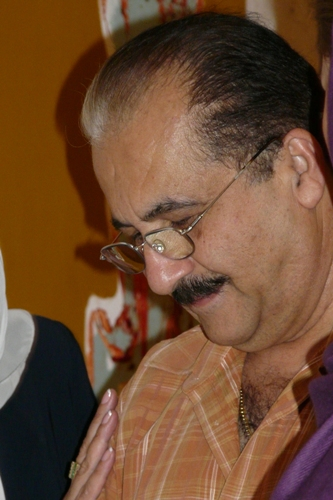
Hojat Shakiba

Hojat Shakiba (Persian: حجت شکیبا; b.1949 in Gorgan) is an Iranian painter.

A graduate of the Faculty of Fine Arts of the University of Tehran, he is known for his paintings on Persian television series, and collaborated with the director Ali Hatami. His painting books include “Khayyam”, “Hafez”, “Irandokht”, and “Role of Photos in Iranian Art”.
