= Saeed Soltanpour =

Iranian poet, playwright and theater director

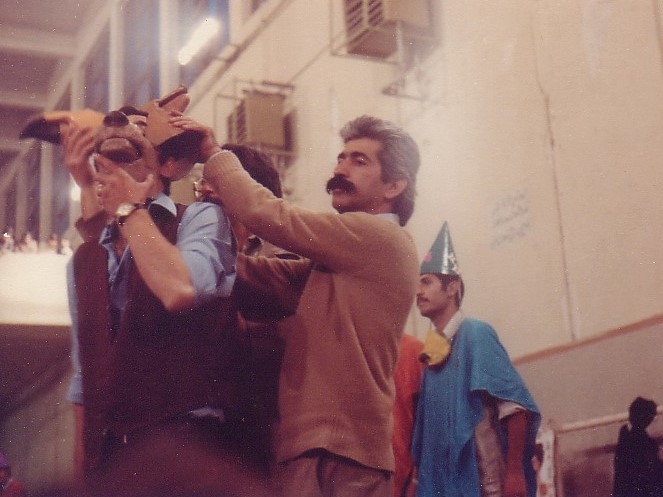
- Occupations: Poet; Playwright; Theater director

Saeed Soltanpour was an Iranian poet, playwright, and theater director who was deeply involved in left-wing politics and a member of the Iranian Writers Association. He was executed on July 26, 1981, by the Islamic Republic authorities during the 1981–1982 Iran Massacres.

== Biography ==
A founding member of Iran's Theatre Society in 1968, many of his plays faced censorship in Iran. His final play was titled Koshtargah ("Slaughter House"). In 1980, he was elected to the Executive Committee of the Writers Association of Iran.

During his summary trial in 1981, Soltanpour stated that he viewed the Islamic Republic as a corrupt government that would soon be "crushed by the people it has betrayed." Judge Mohammad Mohammadi Gilani declared him a "crusader against God", and sentenced him to death.
