= Mahmud Shaterian =

- Born: Tabriz
- Instrument: Tar (lute)

Mahmud Shaterian (1944–2006) was a famous Iranian Azerbaijani composer, musician and Tar master. He was born in Ahrab district of Tabriz. He had great role in surviving and preserving Azerbaijani music in Iran. He was also active in Radio and Television orchestra of Iran.

== Sources ==
- Mahmud Shaterian
- Fars News
