= Tarzi Afshar =

Safavid Iranian writer and poet

- Died: 1679
- Occupation: Poet

Tarzi Afshar (Persian: طرزی افشار, Azerbaijani: طرزی افشار) was a 17th-century poet in Safavid Iran who wrote in the Persian and Azerbaijani languages. He is the author of a small divan of "humorous poems", written in an amalgam of Persian and Azerbaijani known as Tarzilik. Later, for some time, this type of poetry became relatively popular at the Safavid court in Isfahan. Tarzi Afshar originally hailed from Rey.

== Sources ==
- Javadi, H.; Burrill, K. (1988). "AZERBAIJAN x. Azeri Turkish Literature". In Yarshater, Ehsan (ed.). Encyclopædia Iranica. Vol. III/3: Azerbaijan IV–Bačča(-ye) Saqqā. London and New York: Routledge & Kegan Paul. pp. 251–255. ISBN 978-0-71009-115-4.
