= Mübariz Alizade =

Azerbaijani Soviet activist and radio broadcaster

Mübariz Alizade (1911–1994) was an Iranian-born figure, who became an activist and radio broadcaster during the Second World War. Alizade was an Iranian Azerbaijani and was born in a village near Tabriz; he migrated to the Azerbaijan SSR in the 1920s and joined the Persian-language service of Baku radio during the Second World War. He was educated within Soviet institutions in Baku, translated the classics of Persian literature into Azerbaijani and contributed to the training of the "first generation of Soviet Azerbaijan-born Iranologists".
