= Hojjat Kalashi =

Iranian politician

- Kalashi in 2019
- Born: c. 1979 or 1980 (age 46–47); Ardabil, Iran
- Education: University of Tehran
- Political party: Pan-Iranist Party
- Spouse: Roshanak Asteraki
- Military career
- Allegiance: Iran
- Branch: Ground Force
- Service years: 2009–2010
- Rank: First lieutenant
- Unit: 88th Armored Division

Hojjat Kalashi (Persian: حجت کلاشی) is an Iranian pan-Iranist politician and head of the Pan-Iranist Party's youth wing.

He has been imprisoned several times and banned from leaving Iran.

Kalashi is a Political Science graduate, and is regarded among younger generations of ethnic Iranian Azeris with nationalist-oriented tendencies. According to Mehran Kamrava, Kalashi has a positive image among Iranian nationalist groups.
