= Alireza Nabdel =

Alireza Nabdel (Persian: علیرضا نابدل, Azerbaijani: Əlirza Nabdil Oxtay; born 1944 in Tabriz; died 1971 in Tehran) was an Iranian Azerbaijani poet, teacher, social critic and a leftist activist.

He was among the primary founders of Organization of Iranian People's Fedai Guerrillas. He was a friend of Samad Behrangi and composed a popular song about him, after his death in the Araz river. Nabdel composed other Azerbaijani folklore songs which were popular among the leftist activists, specially guerillas in Iran during the 1960s and 1970s. He wrote several critical works on social issues, including one on the Azerbaijani National Question in Iran.
