= Rasoul Yunan =

Iranian poet

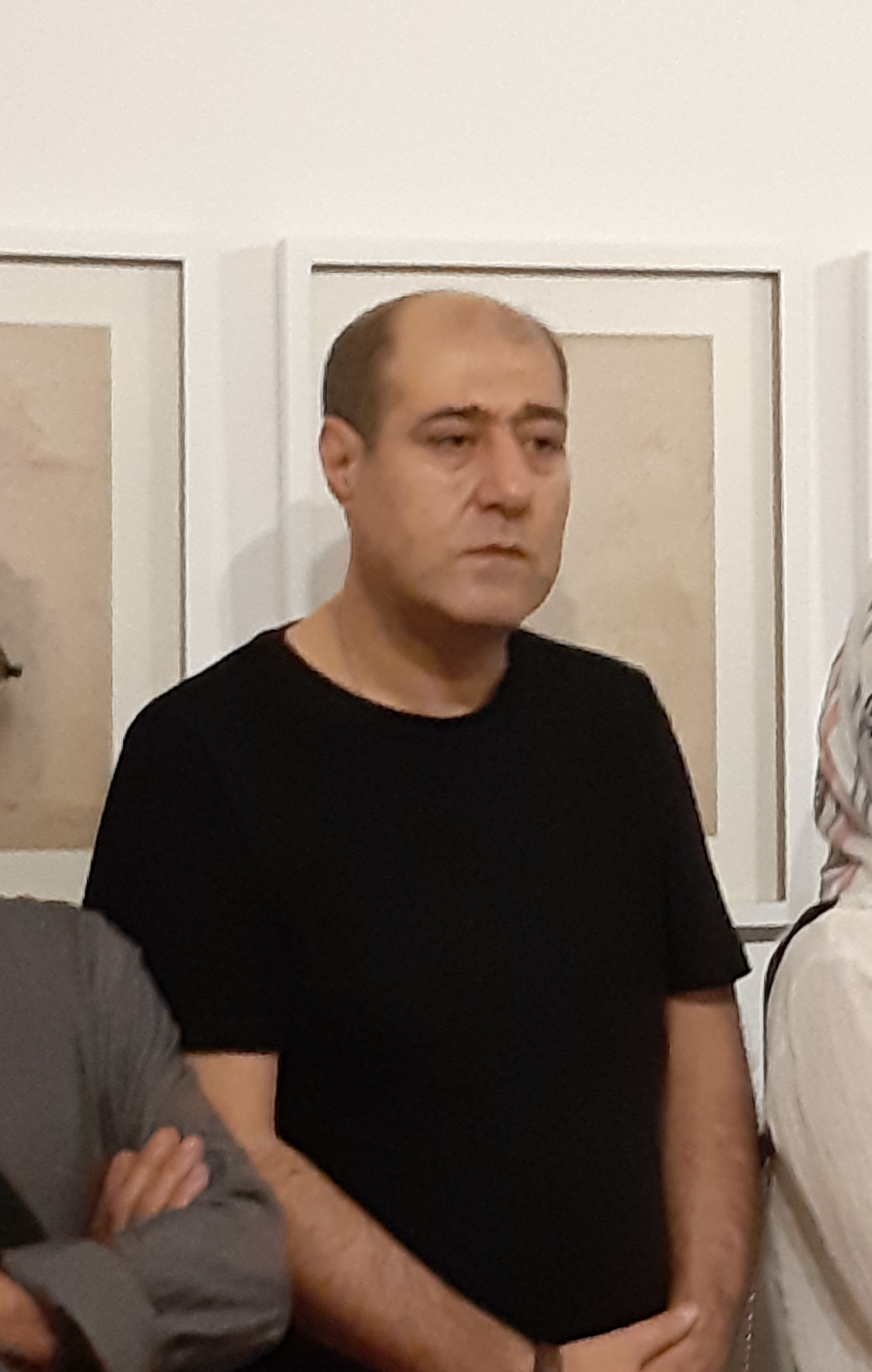
- Born: 1969 (age 56–57); Urmia, Iran
- Occupations: Persian Poetry (mainly) and Azerbaijani literature

Rasoul Yunan (Persian: رسول یونان, born 1969 in a village near Urmia Lake, West Azerbaijan) is an Iranian poet.

He is primarily a Persian poet but is also a translator and writer of Persian literature and Azerbaijani literature. His genres include playwright, short story, dastan and modern poetry.

== Notes ==
- رسول يونان: ميني ‌مال از سوراخ قفل به خانه‌تان نفوذ مي‌كند (IBNA). 4 July 2008.
- رسول یونان: شاعر نشو، برو فوتبالیست شو!.
- "رسول یونان" کیست؟. Etemaad. May 2015.
- رسول یونان به آخرین نشست مینی‌مال نیاوران می‌رود. Mehr News Agency. March 2015.
