= Kiz =

Kiz or KIZ may refer to:

- KIZ (new wave band), a German new wave band
- K.I.Z, a German hip hop group
- KIZ (gene), a gene that in humans encodes the Kizuna centrosomal protein
- Kiz, Utah, ghost town in the United States
- Kiz Bridge, a historical bridge near the Mianeh in East Azerbaijan
