= 1879 Bozqush earthquake =

Earthquake in Iran

- Location within Iran
- Local date: 22 March 1879
- Magnitude: M_{s} 6.7
- Epicenter: 37.8°N 47.9°E
- Areas affected: East Azerbaijan province, Iran
- Max. intensity: MMI IX (Violent)
- Casualties: >2,000 fatalities

The 1879 Bozqush earthquake affected northern Iran in present-day East Azerbaijan province on 22 March. With an estimated surface-wave magnitude of 6.7, the shock killed more than 2,000 people and thousands of livestock. Damage was the greatest along Mount Bozgush.

== Earthquake ==
A foreshock was felt several minutes before the mainshock. Based on the northeast–southwest trending meizoseismal area, neither the nearby Germirud Fault or South Bozqush Fault Zone were responsible for the earthquake; these faults trend approximately north–south and east-northeast-west-southwest. These faults had evidence of recent activity. However, a 2 km (1.2 mi) segment of an approximately north–south trending, southwest-dipping reverse fault was discovered north of the village of Sarighamish, which was situated in the area of maximum damage. The Miocene silicified alunite hanging wall in the southwestern overthrusts alluvial deposits of the Quaternary. This exposed section of fault may be part of the Germirud Fault; a 60 km (37 mi) structure with a similar strike. Seismic activity progressed eastwards when another M_{s} 6.7 earthquake ruptured along the nearby Sangavar Fault in 1896. There remains an uncertainty about the association with the exposed fault and earthquake. The aftershock sequence continued for about six months, and some of these events were destructive.

== Impact ==
More than 2,000 people died and another 4,000 livestock were lost. The earthquake levelled 20 villages and ruined another 54. In Tark, the minarets collapsed from a recently constructed mosque that was destroyed in 1844. Collapsed homes in Miyaneh and Ardabil were responsible for several fatalities. Villages along the southeastern flanks of Mount Bozgush were razed and nearly all their residents perished; at least two affected villages had populations of 500 and 600, respectively. Destructive landslides, with hundreds dead, occurred in Dizaj, Tark, Yangijeh. Significantly high number of deaths were also reported in Mianeh; several well-constructed homes were destroyed and large gashes appeared in the walls of others.

== See also ==
- List of earthquakes in Iran
- List of historical earthquakes
