= Khajavi =

Khajavi is an Iranian surname.

Notable people bearing the surname include:

- Zahra Khajavi, Iranian professional footballer
- Rizali Khajavi, Iranian farmer
