= Intel Display Power Saving Technology =

Intel Display Power Saving Technology or Intel DPST is an Intel backlight control technology. Intel claims that display take up most power in mobile devices and reducing backlight linearly affects energy footprint. Intel DPST technology aims to adaptively reduce backlight brightness while maintaining satisfactory visual performance. The Intel DPST subsystem analyzes the image to be displayed and it uses a set of algorithms to change the chroma value of pixels while reducing the brightness of backlight simultaneously such that there is minimum perceived visual degradation. When the frame to be projected and the frame being projected has considerable difference a software interrupt is asserted and new chroma values for pixels and brightness values are calculated. The current version is Intel DPST 6.0. Intel claims that the current DPST version reduces backlight power by 70% for DVD workloads.
