= Maryam Sadeghi =

Canadian scientist and entrepreneur

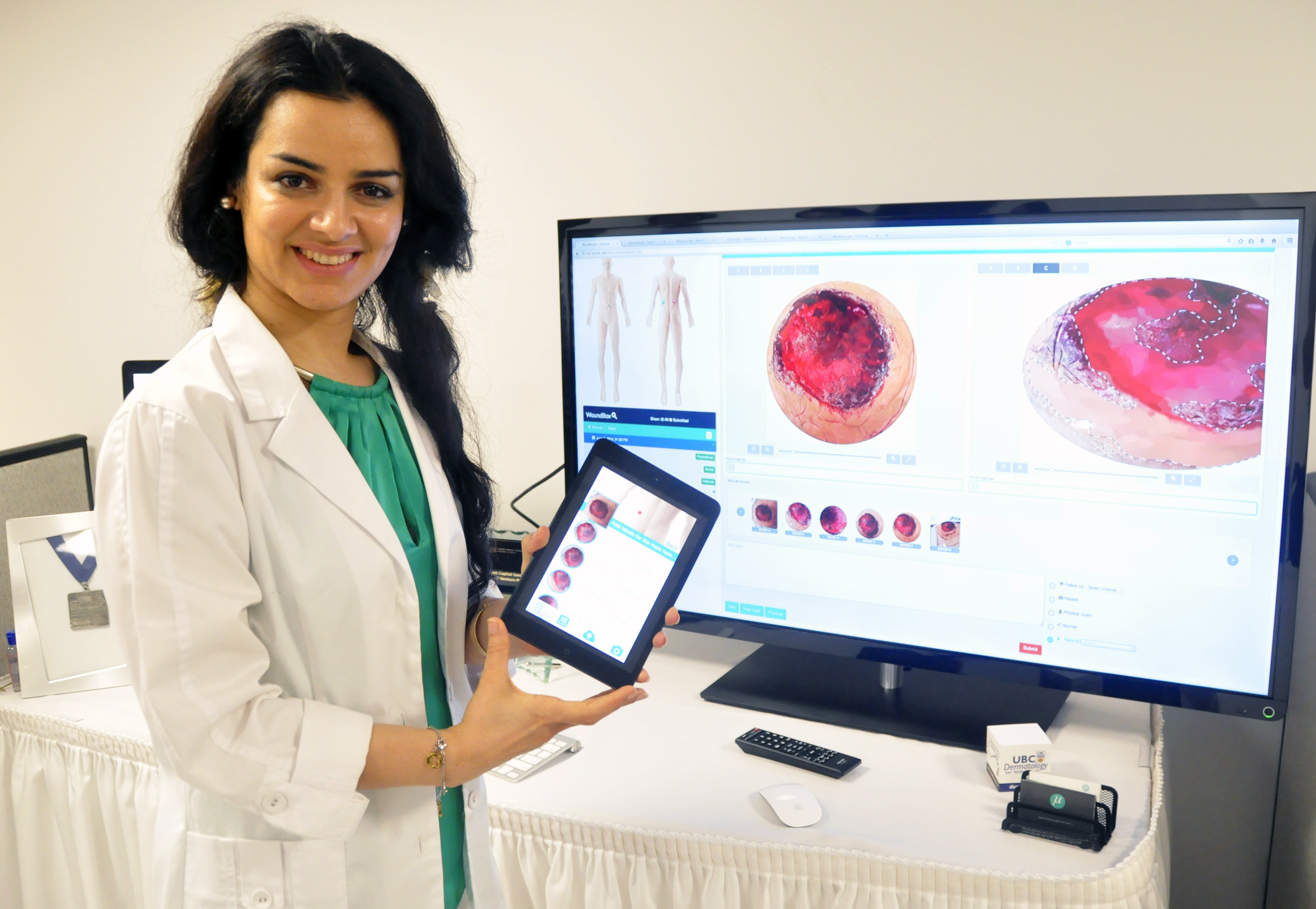
- Sadeghi in 2014
- Born: Mianeh, East Azerbaijan, Iran
- Education: Simon Fraser University (PhD 2012)
- Occupations: Co-founder and CEO of MetaOptima Technology

Maryam Sadeghi is an Iranian-born Canadian computer scientist and businesswoman in the field of medical image analysis.

== Early life and education ==
Sadeghi was born in 1980 in Mianeh, East Azerbaijan, Iran. She completed an undergraduate degree in computer hardware engineering at the Iran University of Science and Technology before moving to Canada in 2007.

Sadeghi holds a PhD in computing science from Simon Fraser University (SFU) in Canada in the area of medical image analysis. Her PhD thesis, titled Towards prevention and early diagnosis of skin cancer: computer-aided analysis of dermoscopy images, won the Doctoral Dissertation Award 2012 Honourable Mention from the Canadian Image Processing and Pattern Recognition Society (CIPPRS).

== Research and career ==
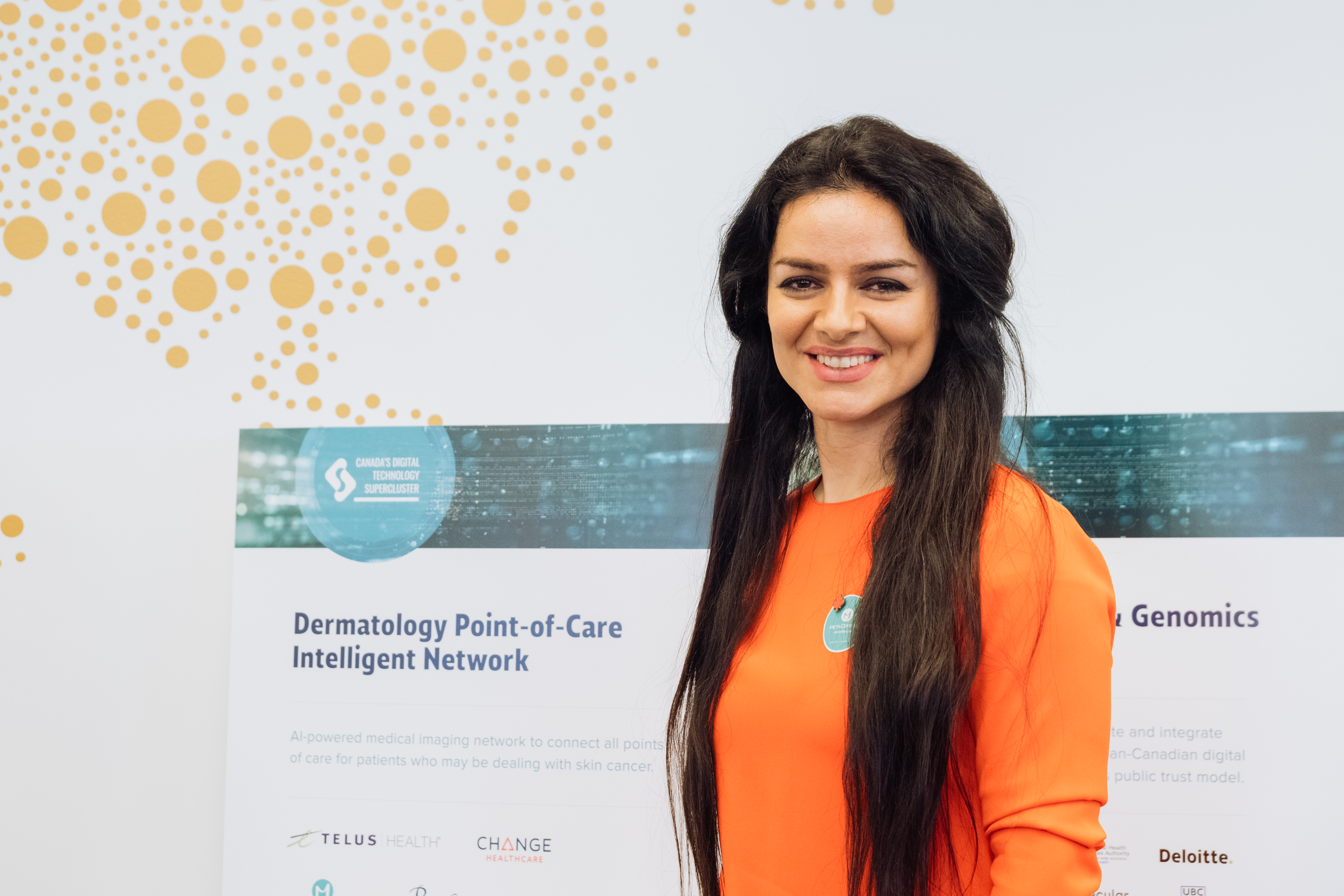
Maryam Sadegh

Sadeghi's company, MetaOptima, developed the MoleScope, a mobile dermatoscope phone attachment, which allows the tracking and monitoring of skin moles. Sadeghi (currently the CEO) co-founded this company with her husband, Majid Razmara (who serves as the chief technology officer). MoleScope is a consumer-oriented device with a magnification tool and light source for professional grade imaging quality, with the option to connect to a cloud-based platform. This connected platform allows users to monitor suspicious growths through analysis and archiving of changes in size and colour. MetaOptima has over 70 employees based in Canada, Australia and the US. It has also developed the DermEngine platform which utilizes artificial intelligence to analyze and classify skin lesions, alongside simplified documentation. DermEngine received the 2019 Ingenious Small Private Sector Award.

Sadeghi was also part of a team that developed UVCanada—a free public health education app for sun protection.

== Awards and honours ==
- WaveFront's Wireless Prize package ($40,000) in the BCIC-New Ventures Competition in 2013.
- Prize in the Plug & Play Silicon Valley competition in Vancouver, British Columbia, in July 2014.
- SFU Dean's Convocation Medal, 2012.
- Nominee, YWCA Women of Distinction Award, 2016.
- Winner, Business in Vancouver Forty under 40, 2016.
