= Mount Bozgush =

Volcanic mountain in East Azerbaijan Province, Iran

Mount Bozgush, Bozqush or Bozqush Kuh (Persian: بزقوش) is a 3,306 metres (10,846 ft) volcanic mountain 20 km (10 mi) south of Sarab and north of Mianeh, East Azarbaijan Province, Iran that separates the Iranian plateau from the Caucasus. Mount Bozgush is a stratovolcano composed mostly of andesite.

== Etymology ==
The name Bozgush in Azerbaijani language means grey bird.

== Highest peak ==
Ağ Dağ with an elevation of 3306 m is the highest peak in Mount Bozgush.
