= Nanoco =

Nanoco Technologies Ltd. (Nanoco) is a UK-based nanotechnology company that spun out from the University of Manchester in 2001. The company's development has been driven by Dr Nigel Pickett, Nanoco's Chief Technology Officer, whose pioneering work on the patented "molecular seeding" process has formed the basis of Nanoco's unique technology. Since 2004, Nanoco has focussed its research efforts into the development and scale-up of quantum dots and other nanoparticles, including cadmium-free quantum dots. Nanoco's technology has been licensed to Dow, Wah Hong, and Merck, amongst others.

The company has a production facility in Runcorn, UK.

Nanoco is unique in the nanomaterials market as a company that manufactures large quantities of high grade quantum dots (QDs), in particular cadmium-free quantum dots and other electronic grade nanomaterials.

== Market Diffusion ==
Growing industrial adoption of quantum dot technology by R&D and blue-chip organisations has led to a greater demand for the bulk manufacture of the product. The bulk manufacture of high grade quantum dots provides companies with the platform to develop a wide variety of next-generation products, particularly in application areas such as displays (Quantum dot display), sensors, LED lighting, backlighting, flexible low-cost solar cells and biological Imaging. The ability to scale up the synthesis makes these materials affordable and commercially accessible.

In January 2013, Nanoco announced a licensing deal with the Dow Chemical Company. Following commissioning of Dow's plant in Cheonan, South Korea, Nanoco received its first royalty payment in 2016. Nanoco signed further licensing agreements with Wah Hong and Merck. At the Consumer Electronics Show 2015, improved backlighting using QDs in LCD television sets was a major topic. South Korean (Samsung, LG), Chinese (TCL, Hisense, Changhong) and Japanese (Sony) TV manufacturers had such TVs on display.

In February 2018, the company announced a Material Development and Supply Agreement with an undisclosed US corporation, to scale up and mass-produce novel nanoparticles for advanced electronic devices. Nanoco has since announced agreements with a number of partners relating to development of nanomaterials for use in applications including sensing.

From May 2009 the company has been listed on AIM at the London Stock Exchange , then in May 2015 it moved to the main London Stock Exchange market.

Nanoco Group PLC filed a patent infringement lawsuit against Samsung in February 2020, following a multi-year collaboration at the end of which Samsung launched a TV with quantum dot technology but without entering a license or supply agreement with Nanoco or its partners.

== Cadmium-Free Quantum Dots ==
There is a move towards legislation that restricts or prohibits the use of heavy metals in products such electrical and electronic equipment. In Europe, the restricted metals include cadmium, mercury, lead and hexavalent chromium. Cadmium is restricted 10-fold more than the other heavy metals, to 0.01% or 100 ppm by weight of homogeneous material. There are similar regulations in place, or soon to be implemented, worldwide including in Norway, Switzerland, China, Japan, South Korea and California.

Cadmium and other restricted heavy metals used in conventional quantum dots are of a major concern in commercial applications. For QDs to be commercially viable in many applications they must not contain cadmium or other restricted elements. In response to a push from customers not to include cadmium in household electronics products, Nanoco has developed a range of CFQD® quantum dots, free of any regulated heavy metals. These materials show bright emission in the visible and near-infra-red region of the spectrum.

Nanoco has developed a patented "molecular seeding" method of QD synthesis. Unlike "high temperature dual injection" methods of QD synthesis, the molecular seeding method circumvents the need for a high temperature injection step by utilising molecules of a molecular cluster compound to act as nucleation sites for nanoparticle growth. To maintain particle growth, further precursor additions are made at moderate temperatures until the desired QD size is reached. The process can easily be scaled to large volumes, and is used to produce Nanoco's CFQD® heavy metal-free quantum dots. While the molecular seeding process lends itself to III-V quantum dots, it can be used to produce a wide range of nanoparticle materials.

== Sensing ==
Quantum dots can be used in the sensor industry to extend the range of current CMOS image sensors out into the near-infrared (NIR) and short-wavelength infrared (SWIR) range of wavelengths. Quantum dots can be tuned for specific absorption bands by adjusting the size of the particle and simply applying a layer onto the surface of a CMOS image sensor extends its sensitivity range out to this region. Extending this range allows the sensors to maintain the small pixel size of CMOS image sensors compared to other expensive technology in the NIR region, allowing for higher resolution camera devices at a much cheaper cost.

Applications for NIR and SWIR CMOS image sensors are wide-ranging and include biometric facial recognition, optical diagnostics, LiDAR and night vision.

== Lighting ==
Quantum dots can be used as LED down-conversion phosphors because they exhibit a broad excitation spectrum and high quantum efficiencies. Furthermore, the wavelength of the emission can be tuned completely across the visible region simply by varying the size of the dot or the type of semiconductor material. As such, they have the potential to be used to generate virtually any colour.

Quantum dots are of particular interest for niche lighting applications, including horticultural lighting.

== Displays ==
In recent years, liquid crystal display (LCD) technology has dominated the electronic display device market, with applications ranging from smartphones, to tablets, to televisions. Continual improvements in display quality and performance are sought. The backlighting technology in conventional LCD screens currently uses white LEDs. One of the shortcomings of this technology is that the white LEDs provide insufficient emission in the green and red areas of the visible spectrum, limiting the range of colours that can be displayed. One solution is to integrate QDs into LCD backlight units to improve the colour quality. Green and red QDs can be used in combination with blue LED backlights; the blue light excites the QDs, which convert some of the light into highly pure green and red light to expand the range of colours that the LCD screen can display.

To further improve the performance of QD-based displays, QDs can be patterned at the subpixel level and employed as colour filters at the front of the displays. This architecture may replace the traditional pigment based colour filters, leading to enhanced efficiencies, viewing angles and contrast, as well as the highly saturated colour delivered by the use of QDs.

The display landscape is constantly changing, but with the shift to μ- and mini-LEDs, quantum dots are looking likely to provide the only solution. μLEDs are LEDs with a very small chip size (down to single digit microns) which can be directly used as pixels on a display device. Due to the viewer seeing the LEDs directly this allows for higher contrast, response times and efficiency over traditional LCD technology, and their small size and high power density opens them up for wearable applications such as smartwatches and AR/VR headsets. μLEDs, however, struggle to represent colours across the spectrum with red in particular providing a real challenge for the industry, with traditional colour conversion techniques such as phosphor being insufficient due to physical size constraints. Due to their small size and high absorbance characteristics, quantum dots provide an ideal solution to this issue. A thin layer of quantum dots can be applied to the top emitting surface of the μLED to down-convert the emission to those required for a full colour display. In addition, this technique allows for the colour conversion of blue μLEDs grown on one substrate, eliminating the need to bring multiple coloured LEDs together in an array for a display using expensive and time consuming manufacturing techniques.

== Biological Imaging ==
Over the years, techniques have been developed for medical imaging using fluorescent dyes, as a powerful tool for the diagnosis and treatment of diseases. However, the fluorescent dyes currently used offer poor photostability, with narrow absorption spectra (requiring excitation at a precise wavelength) and/or weak fluorescence due to low extinction coefficients. The development of fluorescence imaging agents using QDs may pave the way for new medical imaging techniques. QDs offer a number of advantageous properties for fluorescence imaging, including high photostability, broad absorption spectra, narrow, symmetric and tunable emission spectra, slow excited state decay rates and high extinction coefficient resulting in strong fluorescence.

The ability to conjugate quantum dots to a wide range of antibodies opens up a variety of applications both in vitro and in vivo, from cell staining, to point-of-care diagnostics, to photodynamic therapy and tumour demarcation.

In 2020, Nanoco received funding from Innovate UK to develop a heavy metal-free quantum dot testing kit for the accurate and rapid detection of SARS-CoV-2 from saliva samples.
