= Mianeh, East Azerbaijan =

City in East Azerbaijan province, Iran

Mianeh Persian: ميانه
- City
- Also known as Miyana (میانا)
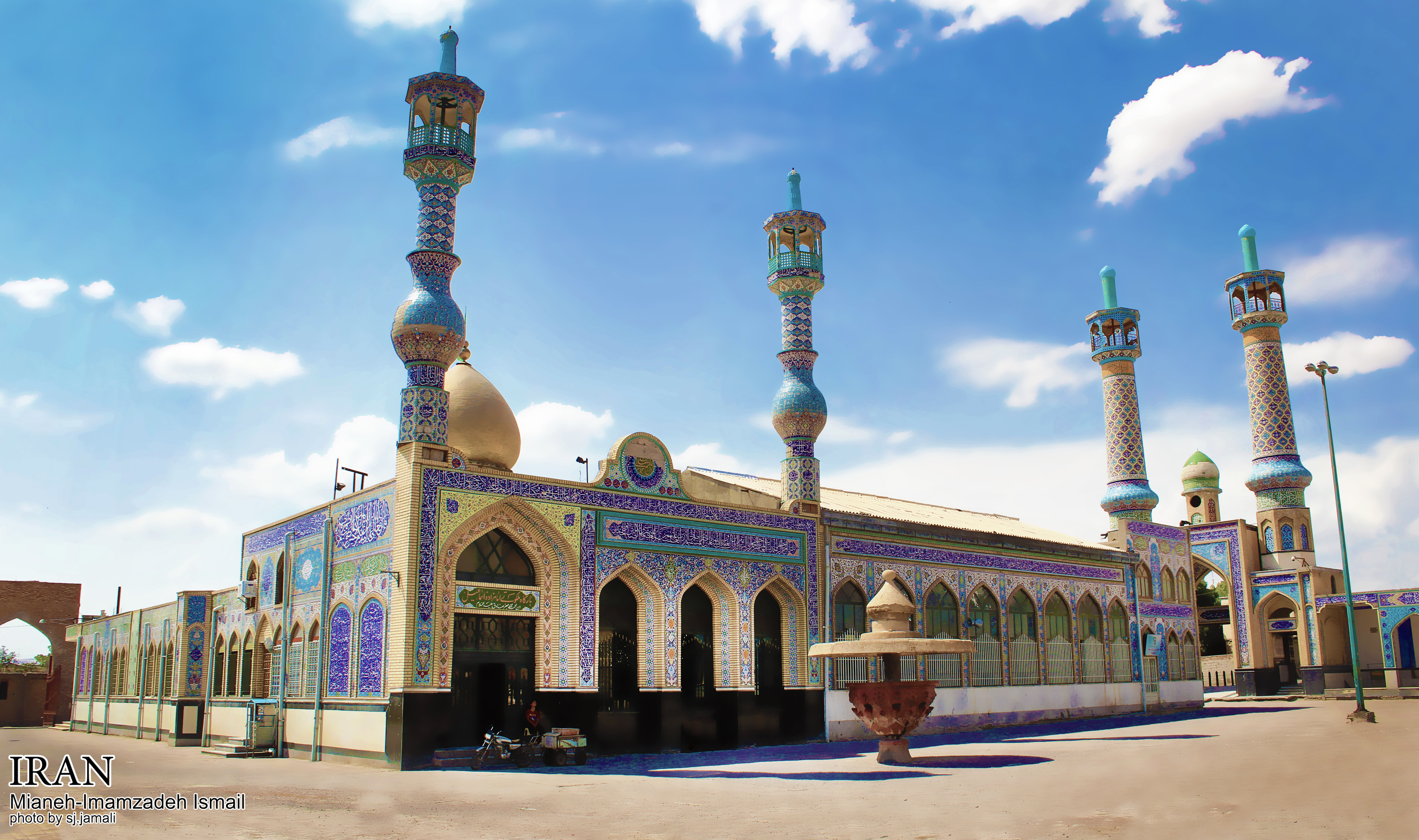
- Emamzadeh Esmaili Mosque in Mianeh

- Location within Iran
- Coordinates: 37°25′24″N 47°42′49″E
- Country: Iran
- Province: East Azerbaijan
- County: Mianeh
- District: Central

Government
  - Mayor: Adel Mortezaie
  - Parliament: Mehdi Esmaeili and Seyed Morteza Hosseini
- Elevation: 1,100 m (3,600 ft)

Population (2016)
  - Total: 98,973
- Time zone: UTC+3:30 (IRST)
- Area code: 041

Mianeh (Persian: ميانه, romanized: Miāneh; South Azerbaijani: میانا, romanized: Miyāna) (Note: Also romanized as Meyaneh, Meyāneh, Miane, Miyāna, Miyānah, and Miyāneh; Azerbaijani: میانا, romanized as Miyana) is a city in the Central District of Mianeh County, East Azerbaijan province, Iran, serving as capital of both the county and the district. It is one of the oldest cities in Iran, as it was first built and settled by the Medians, with records dating the city back to 720 BC. In its province, Mianeh is the fourth most populous city, and also the third largest city, after Tabriz and Maragheh. Mianeh is known as the gateway to Iranian Azerbaijan.

== Demographics ==
=== Population ===
At the time of the 2006 National Census, the city's population was 87,385 in 22,728 households. The following census in 2011 counted 95,505 people in 26,549 households. The 2016 census measured the population of the city as 98,973 people in 30,504 households.

Ethnicity

The majority of Mianeh's population, are Iranian Azerbaijanis.

== Geography ==
=== Location ===
Mianeh is in a valley, approximately 439 kilometres (273 mi) northwest of Tehran and approximately 187 kilometres (116 mi) southeast of East Azerbaijan's largest city and capital, Tabriz. The city was strategically located, during antiquity was a frontier city for a key travel route between Iraq and Azerbaijan.

=== Climate ===
Climate data for Mianeh, East Azerbaijan (1991–2020, extremes since 1987)
Month	Jan	Feb	Mar	Apr	May	Jun	Jul	Aug	Sep	Oct	Nov	Dec	Year
Record high °C (°F)	18.2 (64.8)	24.0 (75.2)	29.8 (85.6)	33.8 (92.8)	38.4 (101.1)	42.5 (108.5)	43.7 (110.7)	43.0 (109.4)	40.5 (104.9)	33.4 (92.1)	25.6 (78.1)	23.0 (73.4)	43.7 (110.7)
Mean daily maximum °C (°F)	3.9 (39.0)	7.7 (45.9)	14.5 (58.1)	20.6 (69.1)	26.2 (79.2)	32.7 (90.9)	35.6 (96.1)	35.7 (96.3)	31.2 (88.2)	23.5 (74.3)	13.4 (56.1)	6.8 (44.2)	21.0 (69.8)
Daily mean °C (°F)	−1.1 (30.0)	1.9 (35.4)	7.7 (45.9)	13.4 (56.1)	18.5 (65.3)	24.4 (75.9)	27.3 (81.1)	27.1 (80.8)	22.6 (72.7)	15.7 (60.3)	7.2 (45.0)	1.7 (35.1)	13.9 (57.0)
Mean daily minimum °C (°F)	−4.4 (24.1)	−2.5 (27.5)	2.0 (35.6)	7.0 (44.6)	11.4 (52.5)	16.3 (61.3)	19.8 (67.6)	19.5 (67.1)	15.1 (59.2)	9.2 (48.6)	2.5 (36.5)	−1.7 (28.9)	7.9 (46.2)
Record low °C (°F)	−25.4 (−13.7)	−25.6 (−14.1)	−13.6 (7.5)	−8.8 (16.2)	−0.4 (31.3)	2.0 (35.6)	10.6 (51.1)	10.0 (50.0)	5.8 (42.4)	0.6 (33.1)	−16.6 (2.1)	−23.0 (−9.4)	−25.6 (−14.1)
Average precipitation mm (inches)	28.5 (1.12)	26.9 (1.06)	34.9 (1.37)	46.0 (1.81)	36.0 (1.42)	8.2 (0.32)	5.4 (0.21)	2.7 (0.11)	5.5 (0.22)	16.9 (0.67)	34.8 (1.37)	27.7 (1.09)	273.5 (10.77)
Average precipitation days (≥ 1.0 mm)	5.2	4.8	6.2	7.4	6.9	2.0	1.1	0.8	1.2	3.5	5.0	5.3	49.4
Average relative humidity (%)	73.0	67.0	56.0	53.0	49.0	37.0	35.0	35.0	38.0	48.0	66.0	73.0	52.5
Average dew point °C (°F)	−5.4 (22.3)	−3.9 (25.0)	−1.2 (29.8)	3.1 (37.6)	6.6 (43.9)	7.4 (45.3)	9.5 (49.1)	9.0 (48.2)	6.5 (43.7)	3.7 (38.7)	0.8 (33.4)	−2.8 (27.0)	2.8 (37.0)
Mean monthly sunshine hours	134.0	165.0	199.0	221.0	283.0	348.0	358.0	351.0	307.0	246.0	172.0	133.0	2,917
Source 1: NOAA
Source 2: extremes: IRIMO(1987-2010), Meteomanz(since 2021)

== Economy ==
The city is an important manufacturer of steel. Currently, a lot of Baroque-style construction work is happening in the housing sector, modernizing the city. It has a historical Bazaar where mainly textile sellers, clothing sellers, carpet sellers, and gold sellers are present. Since 2020, a vibrant Sangfarsh (Stone Carpet) has been built in the Bazaar district, where small shops can be found with natural products from across the region and country, amongst others.

== Transportation ==
Mianeh has an important railway serving both industrial needs (for the steel industry) and passenger transportation needs to mainly Tehran, Tabriz, Zanjan, Maragheh, and Karaj.

== Historical monuments ==
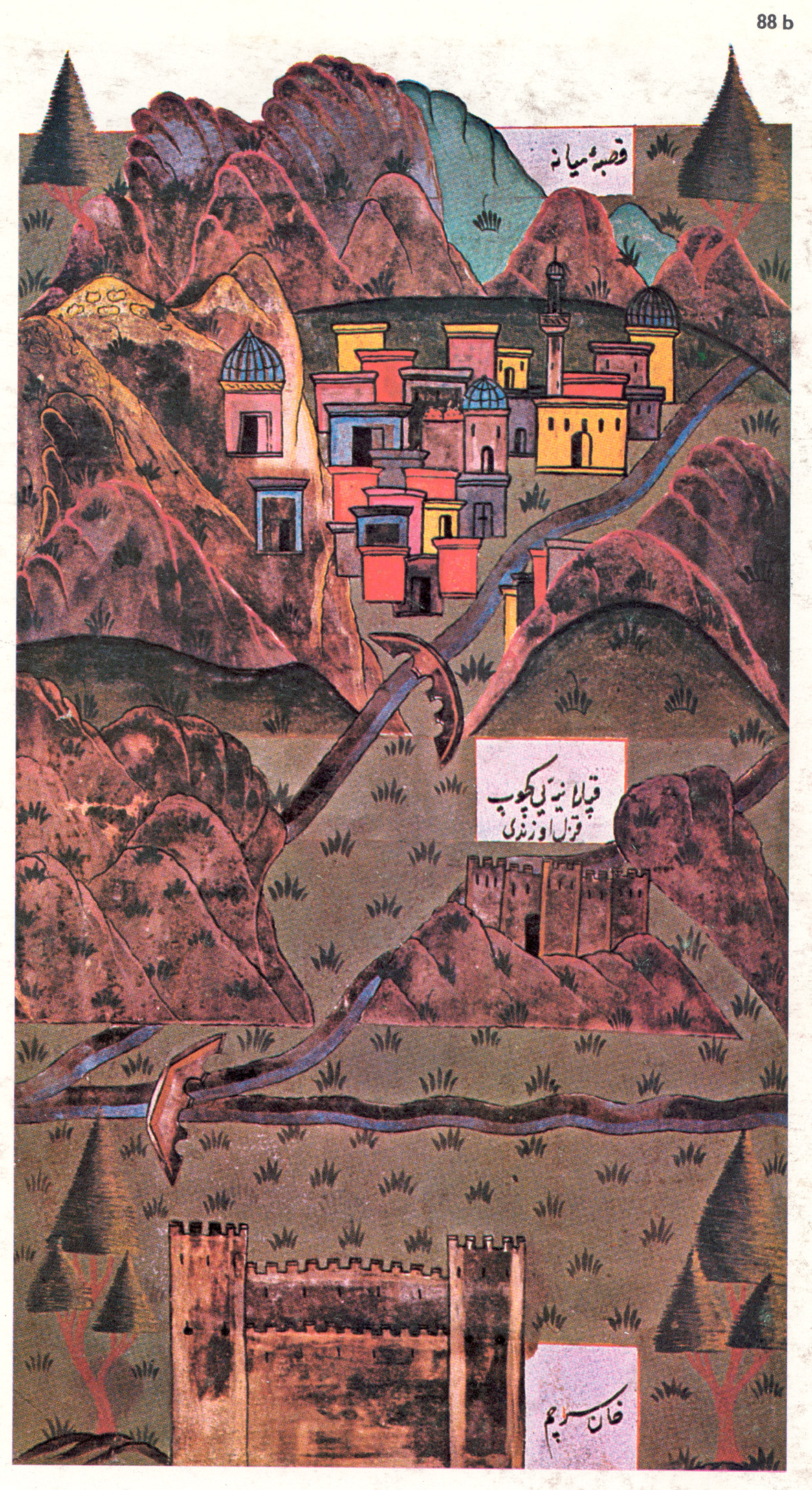
16th century map of Mianeh

Historical monuments in the city of Mianeh include the Imamzadeh Esmail Mausoleum (Kamaləddin). Nearby monuments include Kiz Castle (also known as Qız Qalası), the Stone Tark Mosque, and the Kiz Bridge (Qız Körpüsü). The Kiz Bridge was partly destroyed in December 1946 by Communist militants of the Azerbaijani Democratic Party advocating for independence to halt the offensive of the Capitalist-supported Imperial Iranian Army.

== Tourism ==
Mianeh is a touristic city, with roads connecting to all of Iran.

City of Mianeh

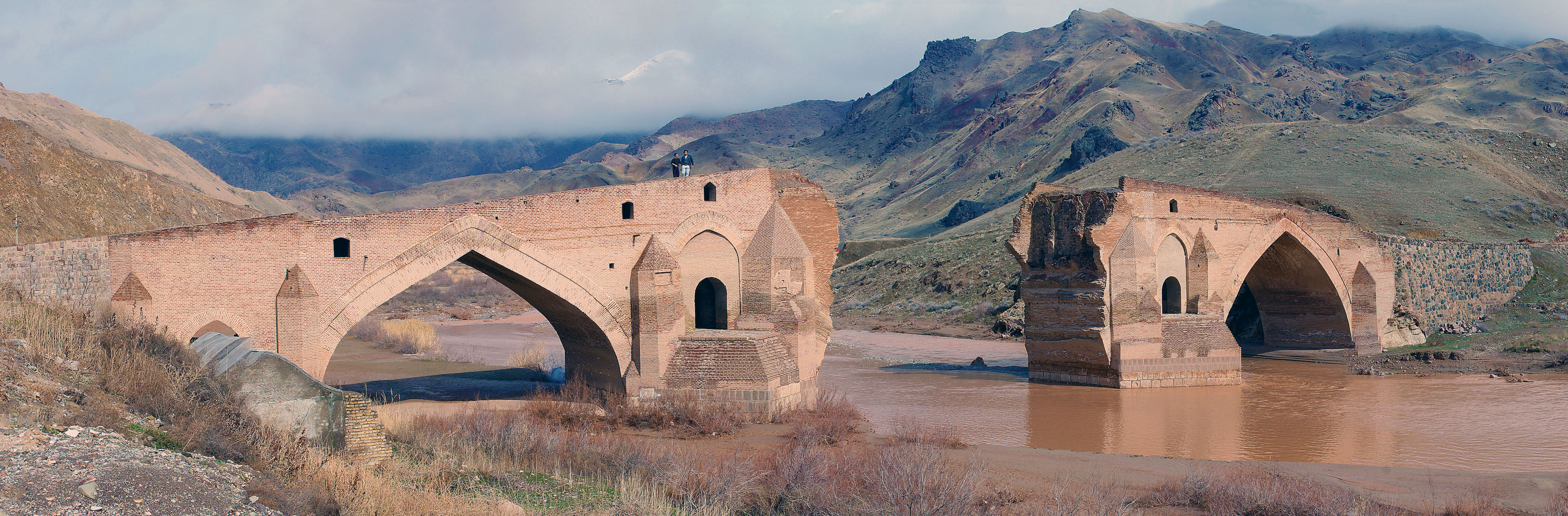
Kiz Bridge

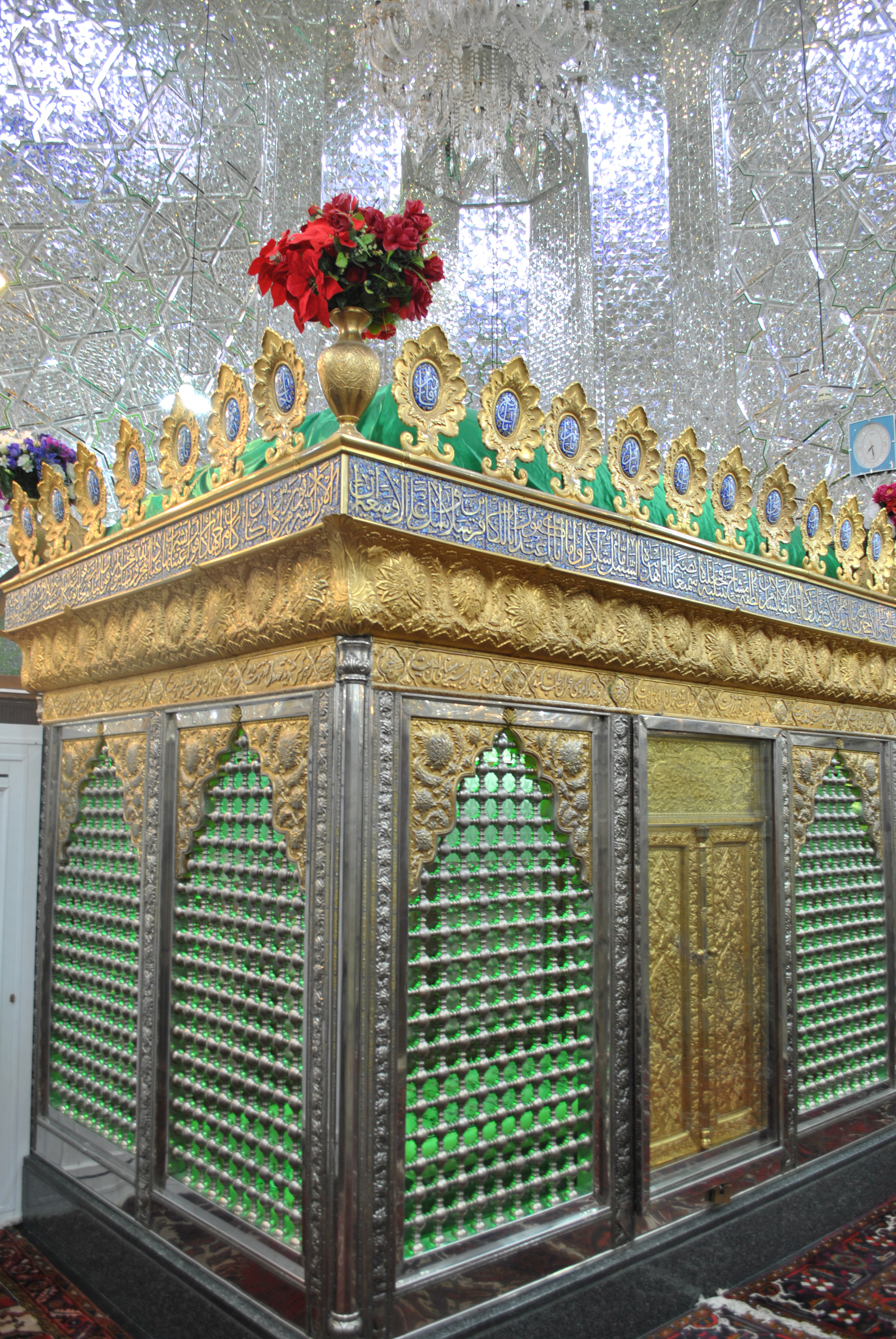
Imamzadeh Esmail Mausoleum

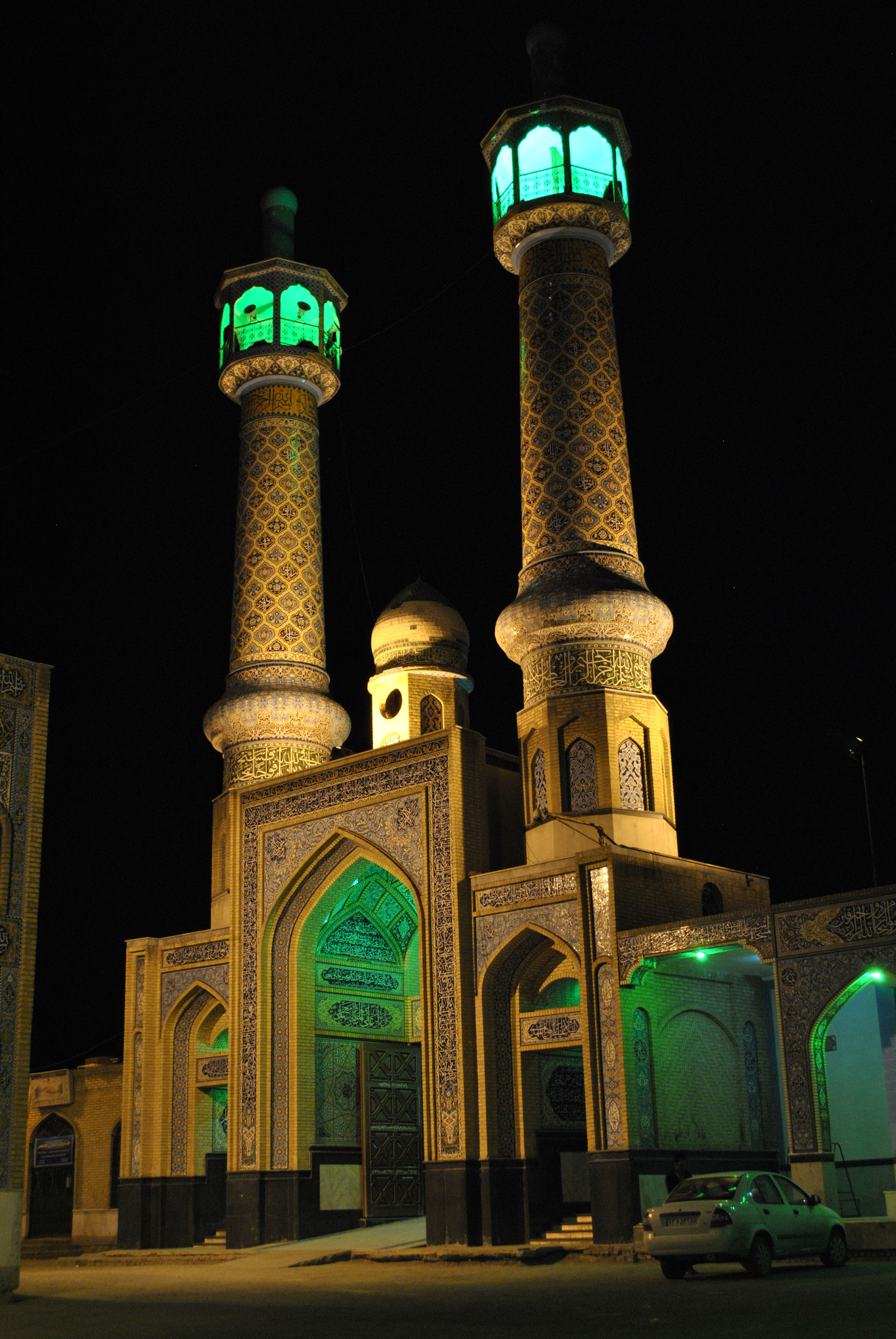
Imamzadeh Esmail Mausoleum

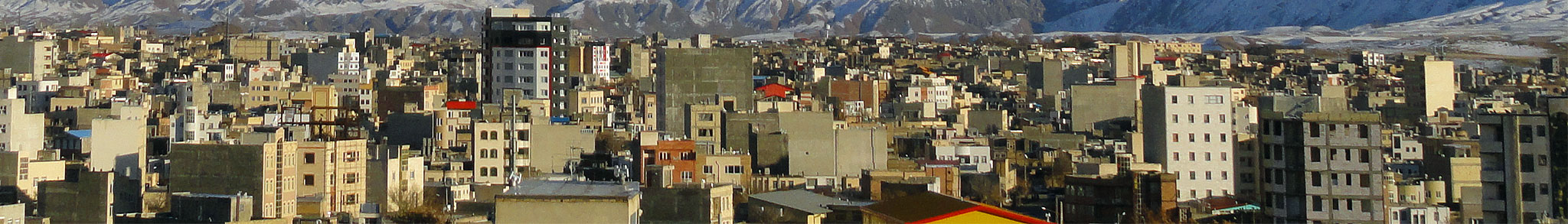
Mianeh city view

== Notable people ==
Among notable people from Mianeh are:

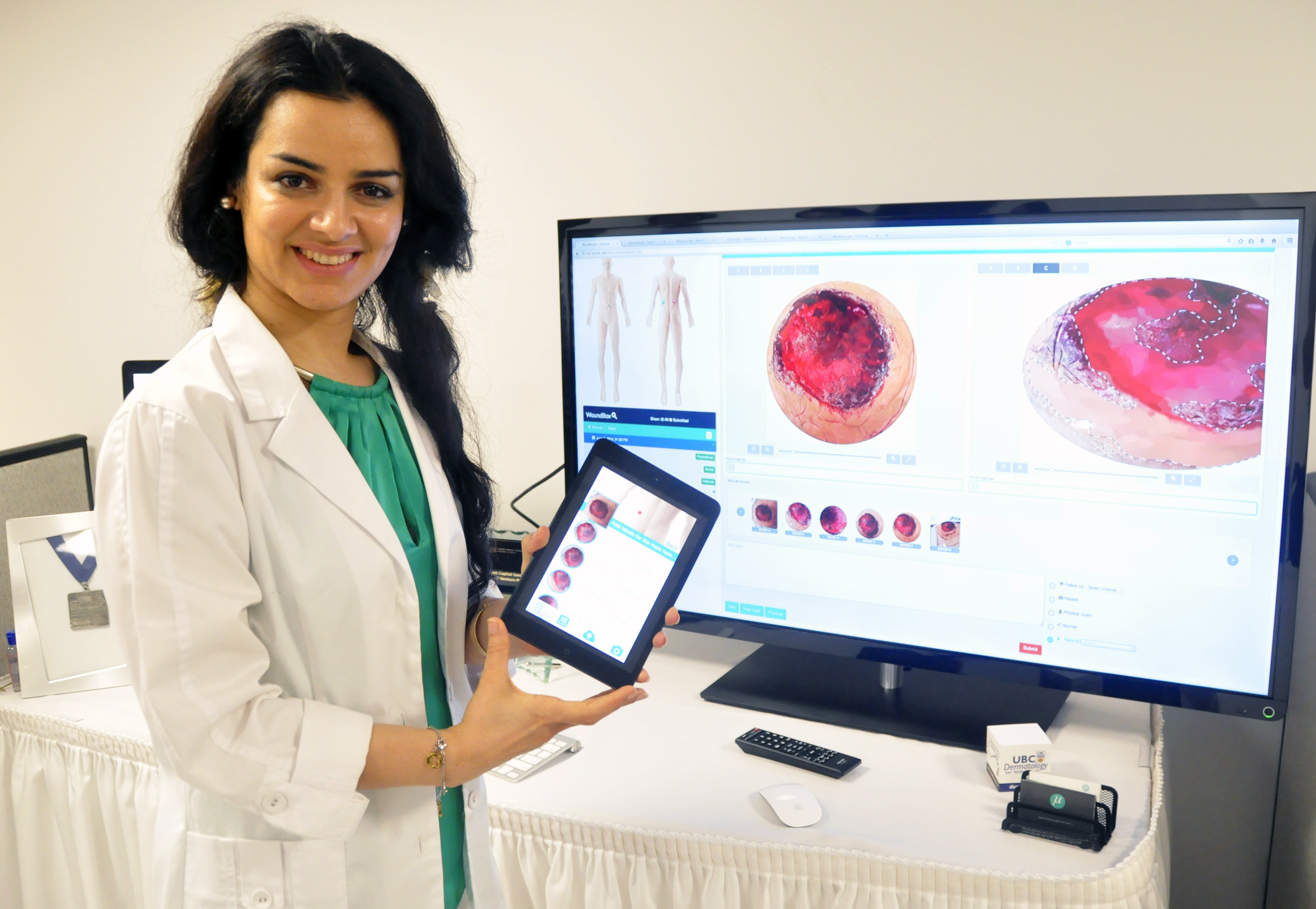
Maryam Sadeghi

- Farzad Abdollahi, taekwando medalist
- Aref Arefkia, singer
- Afsar Asadi, actress
- Rouhollah Dadashi, powerlifter, strongman
- Dariush Eghbali, singer
- Masoud Hashemzadeh, Greco-Roman wrestler
- Khalil Kalantar, optical scientist and engineer
- Yossef Karami, taekwando Olympic medalist
- Rizali Khajavi, selfless farmer
- Behnam Mahmoudi, volleyball player
- Shahram Mahmoudi, volleyball player
- Sharifeh Mohammadi (born 1979), social activist and political prisoner sentenced to death, held in Lakan Prison
- Jafar Panahi, director of the movies The Circle, The White Balloon and Crimson Gold
- Abbasali Panbehi, community activist and politician
- Maryam Sadeghi (born 1980), Iranian-born Canadian computer scientist and businesswoman in the field of medical image analysis

== See also ==
- East Azerbaijan
- Tabriz
