= Stone Tark Mosque =

Mosque in Tark, East Azerbaijan, Iran

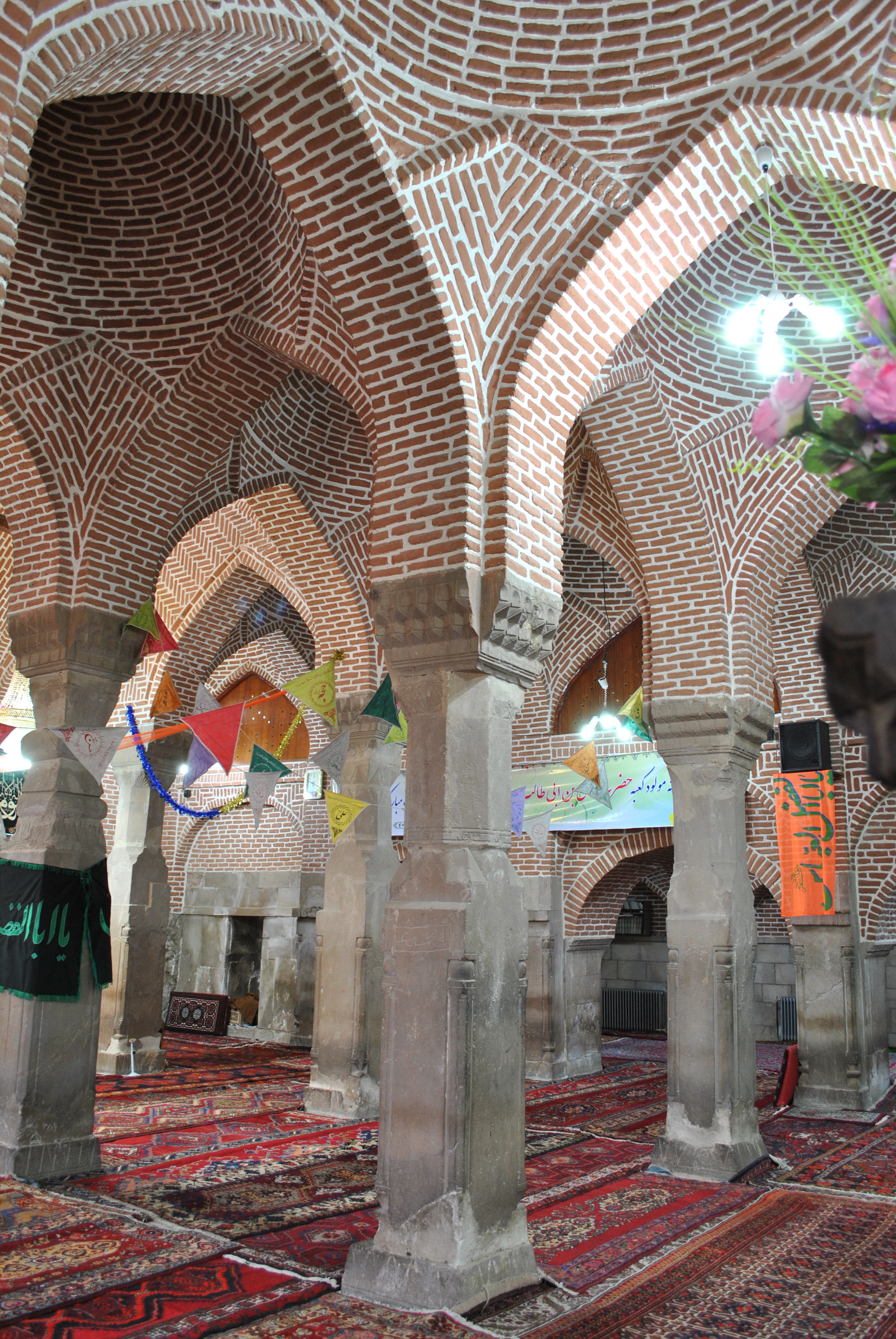
- The mosque interior, in 2015

- Location of the mosque in Iran

Religion
- Affiliation: Shia Islam
- Ecclesiastical or organizational status: Mosque
- Status: Active

Location
- Location: Tark, East Azerbaijan
- Country: Iran
- Interactive map of Stone Tark Mosque
- Coordinates: 37°36′57″N 47°46′24″E

Architecture
- Type: Mosque architecture
- Style: Ilkhanate
- Founder: Khwaja Kavus Tarki
- Completed: Ilkhanate; 1016 AH (1607/1608 CE) (reconstruction); 1865 (reconstruction); 1803 (reconstruction); 1984 (reconstruction)

Specifications
- Dome: 13
- Minaret: One (destroyed by 1879 earthquake)
- Materials: Stone; bricks

Iran National Heritage List
- Official name: Tark Mosque
- Type: Built
- Designated: 19 August 1969
- Reference no.: 868
- Conservation organization: Cultural Heritage, Handicrafts and Tourism Organization of Iran

The Stone Tark Mosque (Arabic: مسجد صخر ترك; Persian: مسجد سنگی ترک), also known as the Sangi Mosque, is a Shi'ite mosque, located in Tark, in the province of East Azerbaijan, Iran. The mosque was built during the Ilkhanate; and has been restored many times since, due to the impact of earthquakes.

The mosque was added to the Iran National Heritage List on 19 August 1969, administered by the Cultural Heritage, Handicrafts and Tourism Organization of Iran.

== Overview ==
The sanctuary of the mosque has been carved from a monolithic stone and it has spectacular engravings. The period of the completion of the mosque is not known. The mosque is reputed to have been constructed in either the 7th or 8th centuries CE; or in the 13th or 14th centuries. There are numerous inscriptions and carvings in Nasta’liq script, from 1016 AH (1607/1608 CE), most likely when the mosque was renovated. The Tark Stone Mosque is one of the few stone mosques in Iran. Its seraglios have been completed with bricks. The tomb of the mosque's founder, believed to be Khwaja Kavus Tarki, is located in southwest of the mosque.

The mosque was reconstructed in 1865, after two earthquakes. The mosque features a brick nave, adorned with pillars and a stone sanctuary. Large stones carved with plant, geometric, and calligraphy motifs adorn the nave's inner and outer walls. The mosque's minaret and upper floor was destroyed by the 1879 Bozqush earthquake.

== See also ==
- Shia Islam in Iran
- List of mosques in Iran
