= Rizali Khajavi =

Iranian farmer 1931–2017

The selfless farmer Rizali Khajavi
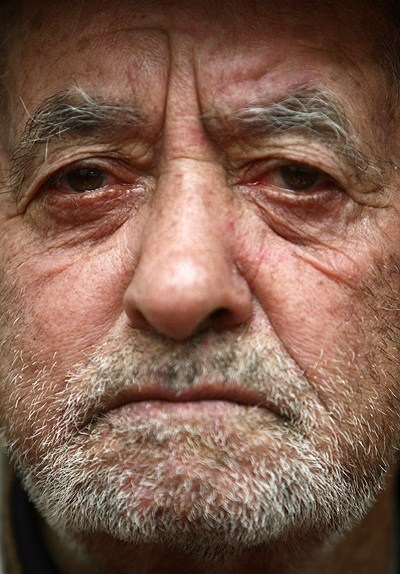
- Khajavi in a hospital in Karaj, 2015
- Born: Azbarali Hajavi; 24 February 1931; Mianeh, Imperial State of Iran
- Died: 2 December 2017 (aged 86); Tabriz, Iran

Azbarali Hajavi (Persian: ازبرعلی حاجوی), better known as Rizali Khajavi or the Selfless Farmer(Persian: دهقان فداکار) was an Iranian farmer who became famous for his efforts to prevent a train from hitting boulders that had fallen on its way.

== Life ==
Khajavi was born in 1931 in a village near Mianeh.

On a November night in the year 1961, when he was 32 years old, he noticed that a railway was blocked by boulders that had fallen from a mountain. To stop the train that was heading towards the boulders, he ran in front of it, removed his clothes and set fire to them on a stick. However, the train did not stop and he had to fire several bullets into the air with his hunting gun to notify the train drivers. The story of his sacrifice was then written in Iran's schoolbooks as a role model for children to follow.

Khajavi died in 2017 at the age of 86, from severe pulmonary complication in a hospital in Tabriz. After his death, the Iranian state TV aired a message by the Parliament speaker Ali Larijani expressing his condolences, saying "the courageous story of Mr. Riz Ali Khajavi and his sacrifice to save the lives of his compatriots became a lesson for the children of our homeland."
