= KIZ (gene) =

Protein-coding gene in the species Homo sapiens

Identifiers
- Aliases: KIZ, C20orf19, Kizuna, NCRNA00153, PLK1S1, RP69, HT013, kizuna centrosomal protein
- External IDs: OMIM: 615757; MGI: 2684960; GeneCards: KIZ

Gene location (Human)
Chr.	Chromosome 20 (human)
Band	20p11.23	Start	21,125,983 bp
Band	20p11.23	End	21,246,622 bp

Gene location (Mouse)
Chr.	Chromosome 2 (mouse)
Band	2|2 G1-G2	Start	146,855,864 bp
Band	2|2 G1-G2	End	146,970,097 bp
RNA expression pattern
Bgee	Human / Mouse (ortholog); Top expressed in: sperm; germinal epithelium; Brodmann area 23; parietal pleura; tibia; lateral nuclear group of thalamus; inferior ganglion of vagus nerve; mucosa of paranasal sinus; spinal ganglia; muscle layer of sigmoid colon / Top expressed in: interventricular septum; seminiferous tubule; myocardium of ventricle; otolith organ; utricle; spermatid; spermatocyte; olfactory epithelium; Rostral migratory stream; otic vesicle; More reference expression data
BioGPS	n/a
Gene ontology
Molecular function	protein binding; protein kinase binding
Cellular component	cytoplasm; centrosome; cell projection; cytoskeleton; microtubule organizing center
Biological process	spindle organization
Sources:Amigo / QuickGO
Orthologs
Databases	NCBI: entry; OMA: entry
Species	Human	Mouse
Entrez	55857	228730
Ensembl	ENSG00000088970	ENSMUSG00000074749
UniProt	Q2M2Z5	Q3UXL4
RefSeq (mRNA)	NM_001163022; NM_001163023; NM_001276389; NM_018474; NM_001352434 NM_001352435; NM_001352436	NM_001033298
RefSeq (protein)	NP_001156494; NP_001156495; NP_001263318; NP_060944; NP_001339363 NP_001339364; NP_001339365	NP_001028470
Location (UCSC)	Chr 20: 21.13 – 21.25 Mb	Chr 2: 146.86 – 146.97 Mb
PubMed search
- Wikidata
View/Edit Human	View/Edit Mouse

Kizuna centrosomal protein is a protein that in humans is encoded by the KIZ gene.

== Function ==
The protein encoded by this gene localizes to centrosomes, strengthening and stabilizing the pericentriolar region prior to spindle formation. The encoded protein usually remains with the mother centrosome after centrosomal duplication. Several transcript variants encoding different isoforms have been found for this gene. [provided by RefSeq, Feb 2013].

== Clinical significance ==
Mutations in KIZ cause Rod-cone dystrophy (RCD).
