= Kiz Bridge =

Maiden Bridge پل دختر
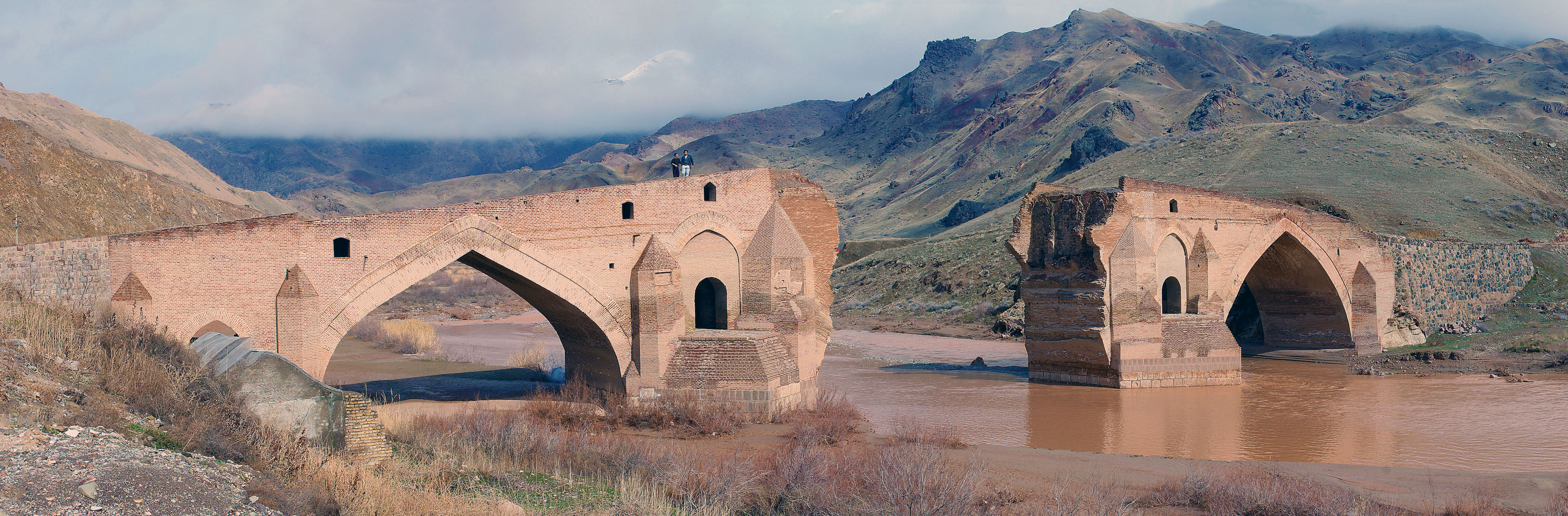
- Coordinates: 37.1927°N 47.4905°E
- Crosses: Qezel Ozan
- Locale: Mianeh, Iran
- Other name: Qezel Ozan Bridge

History
- Construction end: Seljuk Empire era

Iran National Heritage List
- Official name: Maiden Bridge
- Type: Bridge
- Designated: 1932
- Reference no.: 87
- Conservation organization: Cultural Heritage, Handicrafts and Tourism Organization of Iran

Location
- Interactive map of Maiden Bridge

Maiden Bridge (Persian: پل دختر, Azerbaijani: قيز کؤرپۆسۆ) is a historical bridge near the Mianeh in East Azerbaijan.

The age of the bridge is unknown, some archaeologists date it to the Sassanid era while other attribute to as being AD 8th century Muslim era construct. The bridge is constructed of three arches with the center arch narrower than the respective side arches.

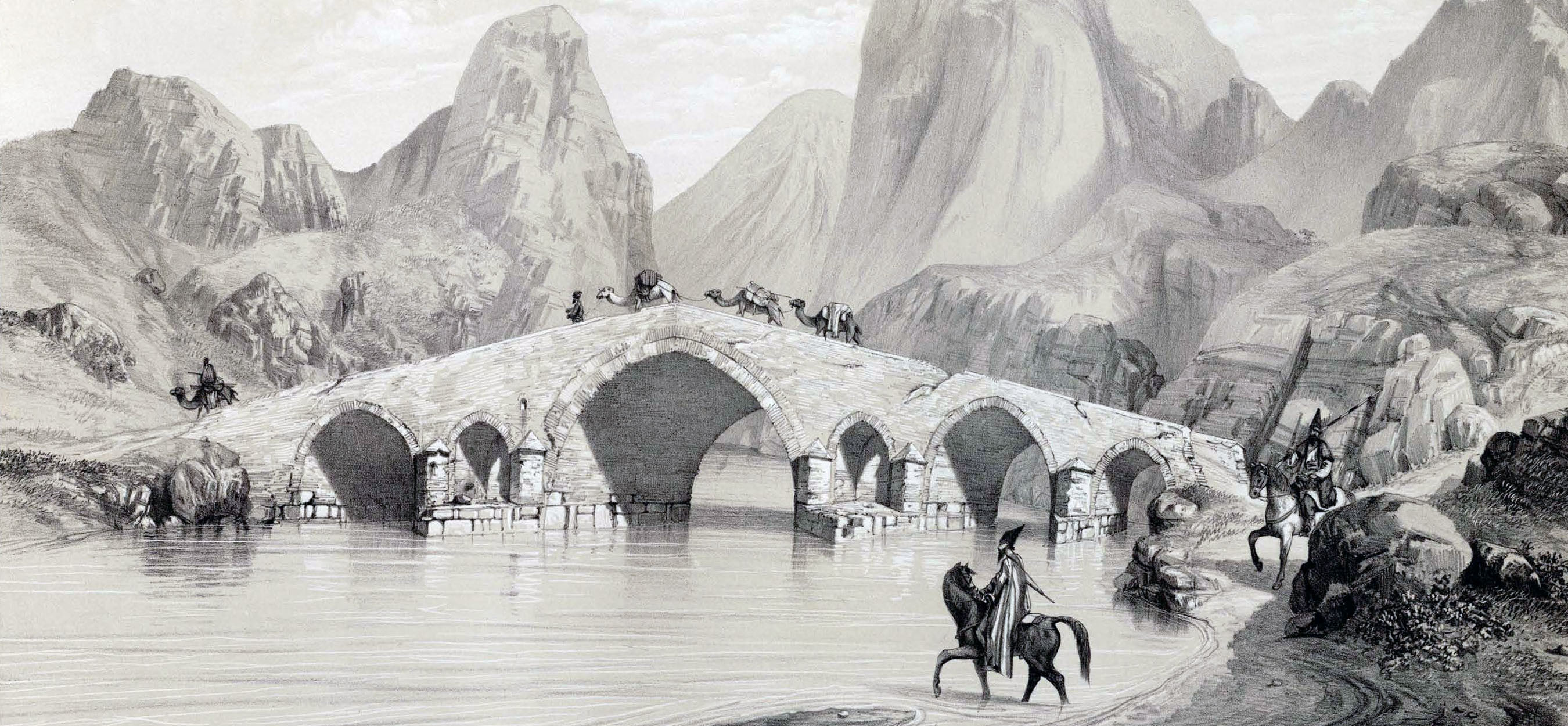
The painting by Eugène Flandin in 1840

The bridge was partly destroyed in December 1946 by communist separatists of the Azerbaijani Democratic Party in a futile attempt to halt the advance of the Imperial Iranian Army.
