= Backlight =

Form of illumination used in liquid crystal displays

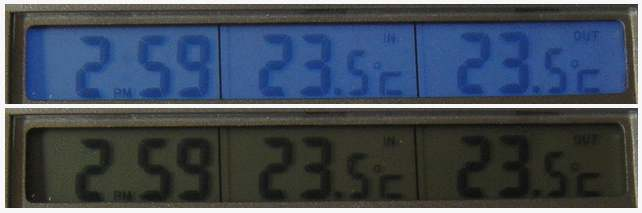
Views of a liquid-crystal display, both with electroluminescent backlight switched on (top) and switched off (bottom)

A backlight is a form of illumination used in liquid-crystal displays (LCDs) that provides light from the back or side of a display panel. LCDs do not produce light on their own, so they require illumination—either from ambient light or a dedicated light source—to create a visible image. Backlights are commonly used in smartphones, computer monitors, and LCD televisions. They are also used in small displays, such as wristwatches, to enhance readability in low-light conditions.

Typical light sources for backlights include light-emitting diodes (LEDs) and cold cathode fluorescent lamps (CCFLs).

Simple types of LCDs, such as those used in pocket calculators, are built without an internal light source and rely on external light sources to make the display image visible to the user. However, most LCD screens are designed with an internal light source. These screens consist of multiple layers, with the backlight typically being the first layer from the back.

Light valves regulate the amount of light reaching the eye by blocking its passage in specific ways. Most LCDs use a combination of a fixed polarizing filter and a switching one to block unwanted light.

Many types of displays other than LCD generate their own light and do not require a backlight, for example, OLED displays, cathode-ray tube (CRT), and plasma (PDP) displays.

A similar type of technology is called a frontlight, which illuminates an LCD from the front.

A review of some early backlighting schemes for LCDs is given in a report Engineering and Technology History by Peter J. Wild.

== Light source types ==
The light source can be made up of:

- Light-emitting diodes (LEDs)
- An electroluminescent panel (ELP)
- Cold cathode fluorescent lamps (CCFLs)
- Hot cathode fluorescent lamps (HCFLs)
- External electrode fluorescent lamps (EEFLs)
- Formerly, incandescent lightbulbs

An ELP gives off uniform light over its entire surface, but other backlights frequently employ a diffuser to provide even lighting from an uneven source.

Backlights come in many colors. Monochrome LCDs typically have yellow, green, blue, or white backlights, while color displays use white backlights that cover most of the color spectrum.

== Usage ==
Colored LED backlighting is most commonly used in small, inexpensive LCD panels. White LED backlighting is becoming dominant. ELP backlighting is often used for larger displays or when even backlighting is important; it can also be either colored or white. An ELP must be driven by relatively high voltage AC power, which is provided by an inverter circuit. CCFL backlights are used on larger displays such as computer monitors, and are typically white in color; these also require the use of an inverter and diffuser. Incandescent backlighting was used by early LCD panels to achieve high brightness, but the limited life and excess heat produced by incandescent bulbs were severe limitations. The heat generated by incandescent bulbs typically requires the bulbs to be mounted away from the display to prevent damage.

=== CCFL backlights ===
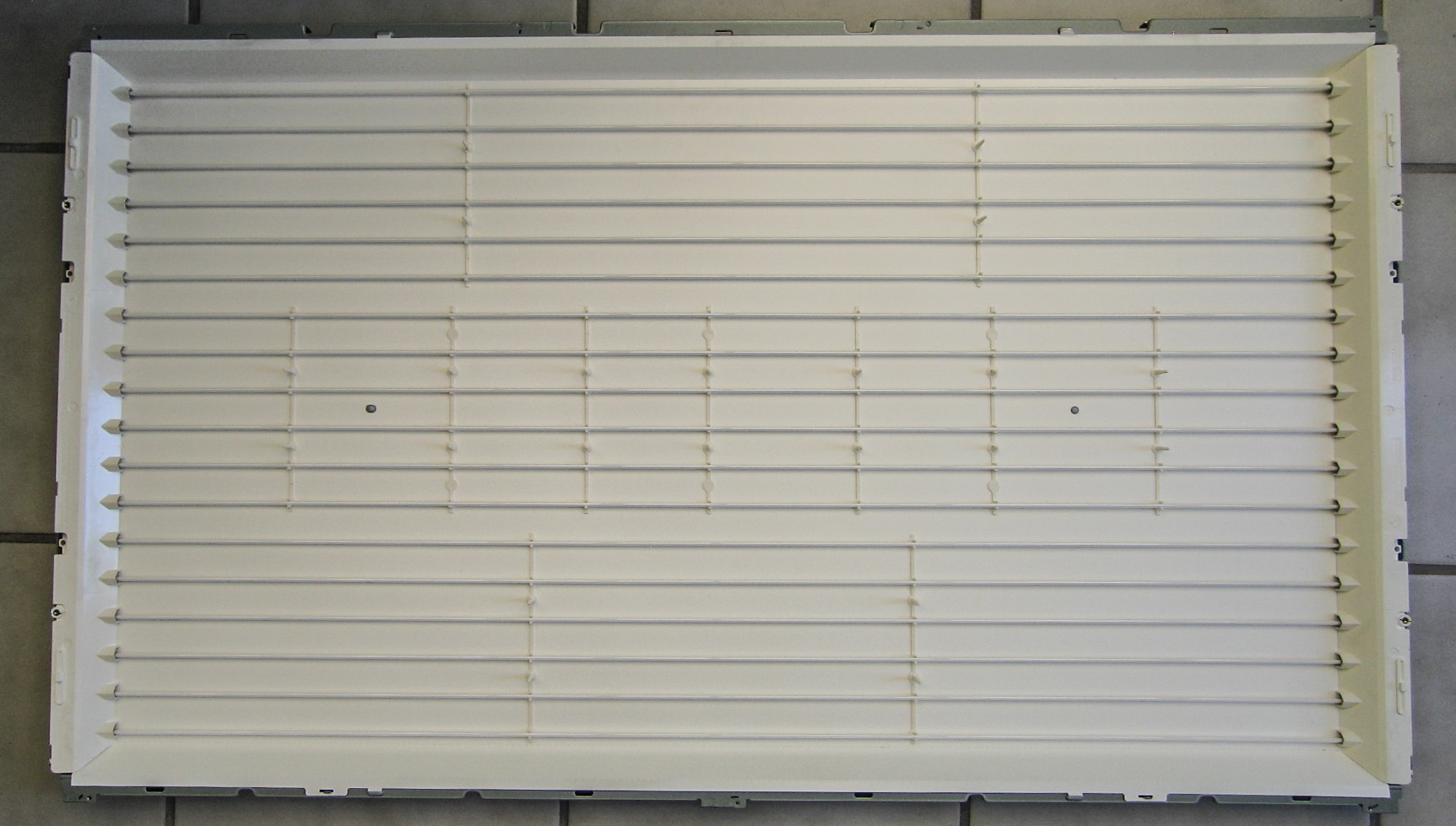
18 parallel CCFLs as backlight for an LCD TV

LCD with edge-lit CCFL backlight

For several years (until about 2010), the preferred backlight for matrix-addressed large LCD panels such as in monitors and TVs was based on a cold-cathode fluorescent lamp (CCFL) by using two CCFLs at opposite edges of the LCD or by an array of CCFLs behind the LCD (see picture of an array with 18 CCFLs for a 40-inch LCD TV). Due to the disadvantages in comparison with LED illumination (higher voltage and power needed, thicker panel design, no high-speed switching, faster aging), LED backlighting is becoming more popular.

Many LCD models, from cheap TN-displays to color proofing S-IPS or S-PVA panels, have wide gamut CCFLs representing more than 95% of the NTSC color specification.

=== LED backlights ===
LCD with LED matrix backlight

LED backlighting in color screens comes in two varieties: white LED backlights and RGB LED backlights. White LEDs are used most often in notebook computers and desktop screens, and make up virtually all mobile LCD screens. A white LED is typically a blue LED with broad spectrum yellow phosphor to result in the emission of white light. However, because the spectral curve peaks at yellow, it is a poor match to the transmission peaks of the red and green color filters of the LCD. This causes the red and green primaries to shift toward yellow, reducing the color gamut of the display. RGB LEDs consist of a red, a blue, and a green LED and can be controlled to produce different color temperatures of white. RGB LEDs for backlighting are found in high end color proofing displays such as the HP DreamColor LP2480zx monitor or selected HP EliteBook notebooks, as well as more recent consumer-grade displays such as Dell's Studio series laptops which have an optional RGB LED display.

RGB LEDs can deliver an enormous color gamut to screens. When using three separate LEDs (additive color) the backlight can produce a color spectrum that closely matches the color filters in the LCD pixels themselves. In this way, the filter passband can be narrowed so that each color component lets only a very narrow band of spectrum through the LCD. This improves the efficiency of the display since less light is blocked when white is displayed. The actual red, green, and blue points can be moved farther out so that the display is capable of reproducing more vivid colors.

A method to further improve the color gamut of LED-backlit LCD panels is based on blue LEDs (such as gallium nitride (GaN) LEDs) that illuminate a layer of nanocrystal phosphors, called quantum dots (QDs). The quantum dots convert the blue wavelengths to the desired longer wavelengths as narrow-bandwidth green and red colors for optimal illumination of the LCD from behind. The manufacturer, Nanosys, claims that the color output of the dots can be tuned precisely by controlling the size of the nanocrystals. Other companies pursuing this method are Nanoco Group PLC (UK), QD Vision, 3M a licensee of Nanosys and Avantama of Switzerland. Sony has adapted quantum dot technology from the US company QD Vision to introduce LCD TVs with an improved edge-lit LED backlight marketed under the term Triluminos in 2013. With a blue LED and optimized nanocrystals for green and red colors in front of it, the resulting combined white light allows for an equivalent or better color gamut than that emitted by a more expensive set of three RGB LEDs. At the Consumer Electronics Show 2015, a number of companies showed QD-enhanced LED-backlighting of LCD TVs, including Samsung Electronics, LG Electronics, and the Chinese TCL Corporation.

There are several challenges with LED backlights. Uniformity is hard to achieve, especially as the LEDs age, with each LED aging at a different rate. The use of three separate light sources for red, green, and blue means that the white point of the display can move as the LEDs age at different rates; white LEDs are affected by this phenomenon, with changes of several hundred kelvins of color temperature being recorded. White LEDs suffer from blue shifts at higher temperatures varying from 3141K to 3222K for 10 °C to 80 °C respectively. Power efficiency may be a challenge; first generation implementations could potentially use more power than their CCFL counterparts, though it is possible for an LED display to be more power efficient. In 2010, current generation LED displays can have significant power consumption advantages. For example, the non-LED version of the 24" Benq G2420HDB consumer display has a 49W consumption compared to the 24W of the LED version of the same display (G2420HDBL).

To overcome the aforementioned challenges with RGB and white LED backlights an 'advanced remote phosphor' LED technology has been developed by NDF Special Light Products, specifically for high-end and long-life LCD applications such as cockpit displays, air traffic control displays, and medical displays. This technology uses blue pump LEDs in combination with a sheet on which phosphorous luminescent materials are printed for colour conversion. The principle is similar to quantum dots, but the phosphors applied are much more robust than the quantum dot nano-particles for applications that require long lifetime in more demanding operational conditions. Because the phosphor sheet is placed at a distance (remote) of the LED it experiences much less temperature stress than phosphors in white LEDs. As a result, the white point is less dependent on individual LEDs, and degrading of individual LEDs over lifetime, leading to a more homogenous backlight with improved colour consistency and lower lumen depreciation.

The use of LED backlights in notebook computers has been growing. Sony has used LED backlights in some of its higher-end slim VAIO notebooks since 2005, and Fujitsu introduced notebooks with LED backlights in 2006. In 2007, Asus, Dell, and Apple introduced LED backlights into some of their notebook models. As of 2008, Lenovo has announced LED-backlit notebooks. In October 2008, Apple announced that it would be using LED backlights for all of its notebooks and new 24-inch Apple Cinema Display, and one year later it introduced a new LED iMac, meaning all of Apple's new computer screens became LED-backlit displays. Almost every laptop with a 16:9 display introduced since September 2009 uses LED-backlit panels. This is also the case for most LCD television sets, which are marketed in some countries under the misleading name LED TV, although the image is still generated by an LCD panel.

Most LED backlights for LCDs are edge-lit, i.e. several LEDs are placed at the edges of a lightguide (Light guide plate, LGP), which distributes the light behind the LC panel. Advantages of this technique are the very thin flat-panel construction and low cost. A more expensive version is called full-array or direct LED and consists of many LEDs placed behind the LC panel (an array of LEDs), such that large panels can be evenly illuminated. Full-array local dimming is often abbreviated as "FALD". This arrangement allows for local dimming to obtain darker black pixels depending on the image displayed.

==== Backlight dimming ====
LED backlight are often dynamically controlled using the video information (dynamic backlight control or dynamic "local dimming" LED backlight, also marketed as HDR, high dynamic range television, invented by Philips researchers Douglas Stanton, Martinus Stroomer and Adrianus de Vaan).

Using PWM (pulse-width modulation, a technology where the intensity of the LEDs are kept constant, but the brightness adjustment is achieved by varying a time interval of flashing these constant light intensity light sources), the backlight is dimmed to the brightest color that appears on the screen while simultaneously boosting the LCD contrast to the maximum achievable levels

If the frequency of the pulse-width modulation is too low or the user is very sensitive to flicker, this may cause discomfort and eye-strain, similar to the flicker of CRT displays. This can be tested by a user simply by waving a hand or object in front of the screen. If the object appears to have sharply defined edges as it moves, the backlight is strobing on and off at a fairly low frequency. If the object appears blurry, the display either has a continuously illuminated backlight or is operating the backlight at a frequency higher than the brain can perceive. The flicker can be reduced or eliminated by setting the display to full brightness, though this may have a negative impact on image quality and battery life due to increased power consumption.

== Diffusers ==
For a non-ELP backlight to produce even lighting, which is critical for displays, the light is first passed through a lightguide (Light guide plate, LGP) - a specially designed layer of plastic that diffuses the light through a series of unevenly spaced bumps. The density of bumps increases further away from the light source according to a diffusion equation. The diffused light then travels to either side of the diffuser; the front faces the actual LCD panel, the back has a reflector to guide otherwise wasted light back toward the LCD panel. The reflector is sometimes made of aluminum foil or a simple white-pigmented surface.

== Reflective polarizers ==
The LCD backlight systems are made highly efficient by applying optical films such as prismatic structure to gain the light into the desired viewer directions and reflective polarizing films that recycle the polarized light that was formerly absorbed by the first polarizer of the LCD (invented by Philips researchers Adrianus de Vaan and Paulus Schaareman), generally achieved using so called DBEF films manufactured and supplied by 3M. These polarizers consist of a large stack of uniaxial oriented birefringent films that reflect the former absorbed polarization mode of the light. Such reflective polarizers using uniaxial oriented polymerized liquid crystals (birefringent polymers or birefringent glue) are invented in 1989 by Philips researchers Dirk Broer, Adrianus de Vaan and Joerg Brambring. The combination of such reflective polarizers, and LED dynamic backlight control make today's LCD televisions far more efficient than the CRT-based sets, leading to a worldwide energy saving of 600 TWh (2017), equal to 10% of the electricity consumption of all households worldwide or equal to 2 times the energy production of all solar cells in the world.

== Power consumption ==
The evolution of energy standards and the increasing public expectations regarding power consumption have made it necessary for backlight systems to manage their power. As for other consumer electronics products (e.g., fridges or light bulbs), energy consumption categories are enforced for television sets. Standards for power ratings for TV sets have been introduced, e.g., in the USA, EU, and Australia as well as in China. Moreover, a 2008 study showed that among European countries, power consumption is one of the most important criteria for consumers when they choose a television, as important as the screen size.

== See also ==
- Khalil Kalantar
