= KIZ (new wave band) =

German new wave band

KIZ was a Neue Deutsche Welle (New German Wave) band from Reutlingen. Founded by Joachim Gaiser, Ulrich Herter, Thomas Dörr, Chutichai Indrasen in 1982. Their biggest international hit was "Die Sennerin vom Königsee". Ulrich Herter has worked with many other bands and musicians - Two of Us, Fools Garden, Camouflage, Sandra Cretu, Hubert Kemmler known as Hubert Kah. The group disbanded in 1984.

== Discography ==
=== Singles ===
- 1982: Die Sennerin vom Königsee
- 1982: Reisefieber
- 1982: Mein Herz ist klein
- 1983: Reisefieber
- 1984: Wo sind meine Alpen

=== Albums ===
- 1983: Vom Königsee... in ferne Länder
