= Khalil Kalantar =

Azerbaijani optical scientist and inventor

- Xəlil Kələntər
- Born: Azerbaijan
- Known for: Backlight unit Backlight optics
- Awards: Honorary Decree of ANAS

Khalil Kalantar (Azerbaijani: Xəlil Kələntər) or Kalil Kalantar is an Azerbaijani scientist, inventor and electronics engineer. He is known for his inventions about LCD displays.

== Education ==
In 1981, he moved to Japan in order to study at Nagoya University. Kalantar has been working since 1987. He got his Phd degrees from TUT university, Aichiken and Tohoku university, Miyagiken.

== Career ==
=== Academic ===
Kalantar is also author of 3 books and co-author of 6 books. Also he wrote more than 150 scientific articles.

In 2008, he became the honorary member of Society for Information Display. In 2011, he was awarded with "The Best Article" by SID.

=== As an engineer ===
During his career, he worked on 2D optical coherent representations, optical-electronic sensors and measuring devices etc.

From starting 1995, Kalantar worked on optic devices and modules for LCD blocks. During his career, he worked with Fujitsu, Sony, Global Optical Solutions. Kalantar is also author of the VAIO's concept.

In 2007 May, he awarded with prize for inventing a new optical design method for LCD lightning.

== Inventions ==
One of his inventions was making light-guided optical boards with micro reflector and micro deflector.

Kalantar is one of the inventors of the backlights of Liquid-crystal displays. This technology has been used by phones, televisions, monitors etc. First generation iPhone's and iPod Nano have used this technology.

He has up to 100 patents about displays.

== See also ==
- Lutfi A. Zadeh
- Optical engineering
