= National symbols of Iran =

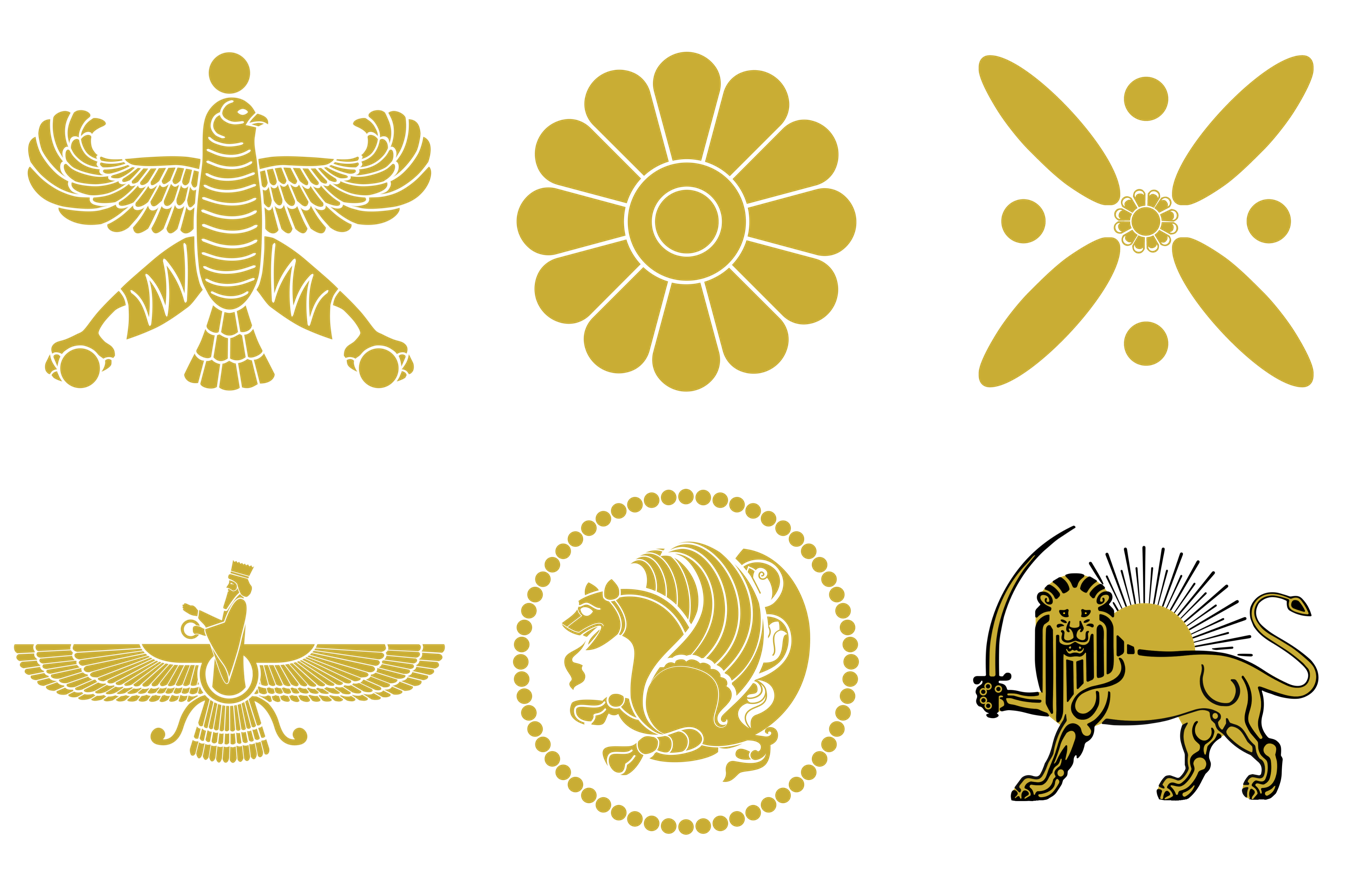
Some of the emblems and symbols representing Iran

National symbols of Iran (Persian: نمادهای ملی ایران, romanized: Namâd hâ-ye melli-ye Irân) encompass national emblems, symbols, or distinctive features revered by the Iranian people at a national or international level, recognized as representative of the country.

== Historical symbols ==
=== Faravahar ===
Faravahar (Farr-e Kiyâni symbol)

Relief depicting the Faravahar in the city of Persepolis, which served as the ceremonial capital of the Achaemenid Empire

The Faravahar (Persian: فَرْوَهَر), also known as Foruhar or Fārre Kiyâni, is one of the most prominent symbols of Zoroastrianism and Iranian cultural identity. It represents the divine farr (glory or divine grace) in ancient Iranian tradition, particularly associated with the concept of Khvarenah or farr-e shahi (royal glory), a radiant, mystical force bestowed by Ahura Mazda that confers legitimacy, sovereignty, and the capacity for just rule.

Ancient Iranians believed that Ahura Mazda selected the king through this spiritual force, known as khvarenah or farr-e shahi (royal glory), which remained with the ruler only as long as he pleased the deity and upheld righteousness (asha). A king endowed with divine farr was regarded as the manifestation of divine power, mercy, and wrath, serving as the representative of the nation's will. Subjects addressed him as khodâyegân ("lord-like") or "shadow of God," while he viewed himself as an absolute ruler and master of souls. Achaemenid inscriptions consistently emphasize kingship as a divine gift from Ahura Mazda, as seen in statements such as "Ahura Mazda made Darius king; Ahura Mazda granted him a great empire."

The term "khvarenah" is described in sources such as the Dehkhoda Dictionary (under "khoreh") as "light bestowed by God upon creatures, enabling them to lead, practice crafts, and industries." Related terms include "farreh" and "khoreh," with references in works like the Borhan-e Qate'.

Faravahar in modern usage, derives from the Avestan term frauuaṣ̌i (fravaṣ̌i), referring to the personal spirit or guardian spirit in Zoroastrianism. Its New Persian form is foruhar or faravahar, evolving through Middle Persian forms such as frawahr or frōhar, and ultimately linked to Old Persian fravarti-. An older pronunciation or variant is noted as "Farahvahar" or "Farahvar."

Over 4,500 years ago, when many peoples of the world engaged in idolatry and viewed human existence as confined to the mortal body, ancient Iranians or Aryans held that humans possessed a soul separate from the physical form. This soul (fravashi) departed after death to another realm to continue its existence. In Zoroastrian tradition, the afterlife abode for souls was sometimes referred to as associated with the stars (akhtaran in some contexts), reflecting beliefs in a celestial continuation of life.

=== Derafsh Kaviani ===
Derafsh Kaviani

Presidential standard of Tajikistan, 2006–present

The Derafsh Kaviani (Persian: درفش کاویانی, lit. 'Standard of Kaveh') was the legendary and historical national standard (vexilloid) of pre-Islamic Iran, notably serving as the official standard of the Sasanian Empire (224–651) and is associated with earlier Iranian dynasties in myth and tradition.

According to Iranian mythology, particularly as recounted in Ferdowsi's Shahnameh, the banner originated during the uprising of Kaveh the Blacksmith against the tyrannical Aži Dahāka (Zahhak). Kaveh raised his leather apron, worn as protection during his work as a blacksmith, on a spear to rally the people in rebellion. After the victory, achieved with the aid of Fereydun, the apron was adorned with jewels, gold, brocade, and tassels in colors such as red, yellow (or blue), and violet (or purple), transforming it into the exalted royal standard. It became known as the Derafsh Kaviani, symbolizing resistance to oppression, national unity, and the divine legitimacy of Iranian kingship. The banner is also linked in some traditions to figures like Jamshid or the Kayanian dynasty.

The Derafsh Kaviani held profound symbolic importance in Iranian warfare, particularly against foreign foes such as the Turanians (Aneran) in epic narratives. Its presence was deemed essential for battle; Iranian forces would go to extraordinary lengths to keep it raised, even "by tooth" if necessary. Enemies recognized its psychological power, viewing it as the embodiment of Iran's strength, capturing or destroying it could demoralize and defeat Iranian armies.

Historical descriptions of its appearance vary across sources. According to al-Tabari's History, it was made from lion skin and later embellished by successive monarchs with gold, silver, jewels, and other ornaments; it was sometimes called "Akhtar-e Kavian" (Star of Kaveh) and displayed primarily in major campaigns or for princes on critical missions. Al-Masudi, in Muruj al-Dhahab, describes it as leopard skin suspended from tall poles. Other Persian lexicographical works, such as the Burhan-e Qate' and Farhang-e Jahangiri, portray it as originating from leopard or tiger hide (or leather used by blacksmiths), initially an apron tied around the waist, which Kaveh affixed to a spear. Scholarly reconstructions, drawing from depictions on Frataraka coins (from Persis, 3rd century BCE), Pompeii-era carvings, and Ferdowsi's descriptions, suggest it was a square or rectangular piece of leather or fabric hung atop a spear (with the spear tip protruding upward), measuring approximately eight by twelve cubits (roughly 4–5 by 6–7.5 meters, depending on the cubit standard). It featured a central star (or radiant emblem, sometimes interpreted as a lotus or sun-like motif) with four rays and a small central circle repeated above, adorned with silk, brocade, precious gems, and four colored ribbons (red, yellow, purple, and sometimes blue) hanging below, each tipped with jewels. The background was often described as purple or richly bejeweled, shining brightly even at night.

In the Sasanian period, the banner represented imperial authority and was carried into major battles, including its capture by Arab forces at the Battle of al-Qadisiyyah (c. 636–637 CE), which contributed to the empire's fall. Some early Islamic sources report its immense value and eventual destruction.

Claims of even greater antiquity appear in certain interpretations of artifacts, such as bowls in the Louvre Museum's ancient Iranian collection depicting what some associate with the Derafsh Kaviani and dated to around 4600 BCE, suggesting possible origins up to 6,600 years ago in legendary terms. Ferdowsi links its prestige to Iran's primordial dynasties, the Pishdadian and Kayanian eras.

The Derafsh Kaviani remains a potent symbol of Iranian heritage, resistance, and national identity in pre-Islamic tradition. Modern reconstructions and artistic depictions often emphasize its jewel-encrusted, star-centered design with hanging tassels.

=== Lion and Sun ===
Lion and Sun emblem

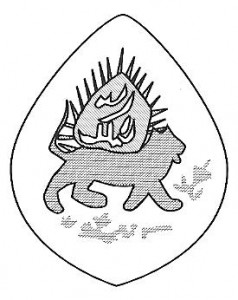
Imperial seal of Nader Shah

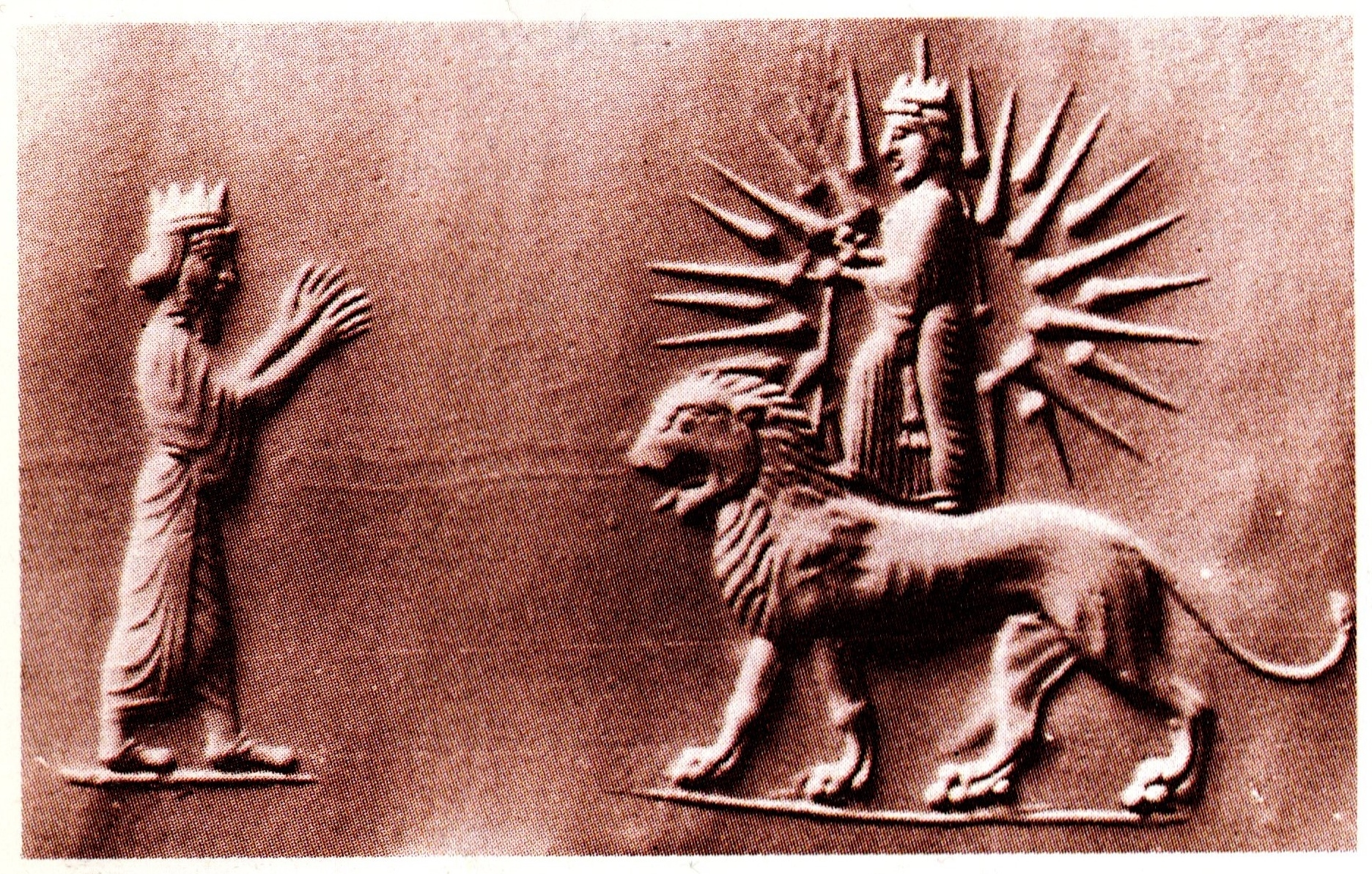
Achaemenid seal, depicting Artaxerxes II together with Anahita in a lion and sun motif

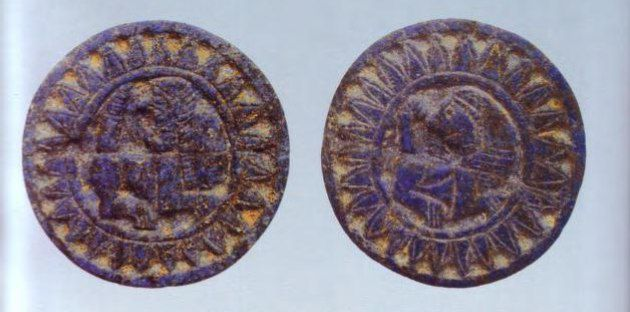
The earliest representations of the lion and sun, a lapis lazuli seal from the Jiroft civilization (c. 3rd Millennium BC).

The Lion and Sun (Persian: شیر و خورشید, romanised: Šir-o Xoršid), is one of the most enduring emblems of Iran (historically Persia). It served as a central element in the country's national flag until the 1979 Islamic Revolution, after which it was replaced by the current emblem of the Islamic Republic.

The motif originates primarily from ancient astronomical and astrological traditions, representing the sun positioned in the constellation Leo (the lion) in the zodiac. This secular, zodiacal symbolism traces back to pre-Islamic Persian astronomy and astrology, with roots in Babylonian and Near Eastern traditions. Evidence suggests the combined lion and sun appeared in various forms before the Islamic era, though its widespread use as a distinct motif emerged later.

The lion and sun gained prominence in the Islamic period, appearing frequently on coins, metalwork, tiles, and miniature paintings across Iran, Central Asia, and India from the 12th–13th centuries onward. The earliest documented instance on coinage occurs under Kaykhusraw II (r. 1237–1246), Sultan of the Seljuk Sultanate of Rûm, where it likely symbolized royal power. It also featured in flags and banners of the Mughal Empire in India.

The symbol's use on Iranian flags is first attested in a miniature painting from 826 AH (1423 CE), illustrating a copy of the Shahnameh-ye Changizi (also known as Šāh-nāma of Shams al-Din Kashani), an epic poem on the Mongol conquests. The painting depicts Mongol (or Mongol-affiliated) horsemen approaching the walled city of Nishapur; one carries a banner bearing a lion passant with a rising sun on its back, topped by a spearhead within a crescent moon and flanked by floating pennons. This represents one of the oldest known depictions of the lion and sun as a banner device in a Timurid-era context.

Under the Safavid dynasty (1501–1736), the lion and sun became a familiar royal and national emblem, appearing on banners, coins, and artworks. During this period, as the Safavids unified Iran and established Twelver Shia Islam as the state religion, the motif acquired additional Shia-Iranian connotations in some interpretations (e.g., the lion sometimes associated with Ali ibn Abi Talib, the "Lion of God"). It served to distinguish Persian identity, particularly in contrast to the Ottoman Empire's crescent moon emblem.

Interpretations of the symbol evolved across dynasties. Initially an astronomical and astrological device used by scholars rather than as a governmental emblem, it later gained royal and religious layers. Under the Qajar dynasty (1789–1925), amid intellectual, social, and nationalist shifts beginning with Agha Mohammad Khan Qajar, its explicitly Shia associations diminished, and it increasingly represented broader Iranian heritage and monarchy. It was formalized as part of the national flag during the Persian Constitutional Revolution (adopted officially in 1907 with the green-white-red tricolour) and continued under the Pahlavi dynasty until 1979.

The Lion and Sun remains a potent symbol of Iranian cultural identity, monarchy, and pre-revolutionary heritage, often invoked today by opposition groups and the Iranian diaspora. Its design typically features a lion passant or couchant holding a sword or shamshir (added in later versions), with a radiant sun rising behind it.

=== Moon and Star symbol ===
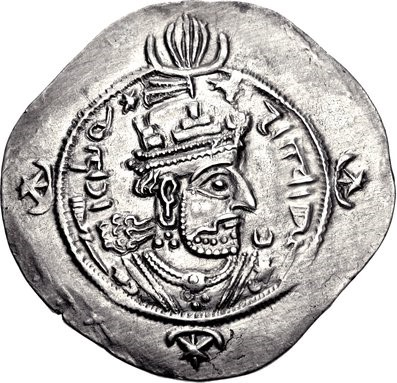
Coin of the Sasanian king Kavad II, minted at Susa in 628

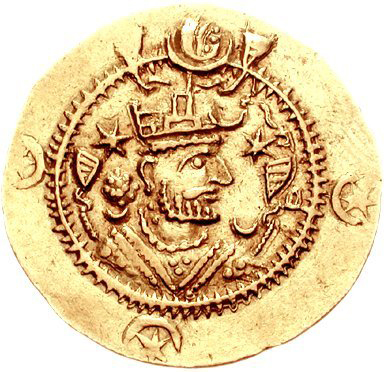
A coin of Sasanian king Kavad I during his second reign (r. 488–531). Kavadh was the first Sassanid ruler to introduce star-and-crescent motifs as decorations on the margin of the obverse side of his coins. Note the continued use of the star and the crescent appearing on either side of the king's head.

The Moon and Star (Persian: ماه و ستاره) (often depicted as a crescent enclosing or accompanied by a star) served as a significant symbol in ancient Iranian royal iconography, particularly during the Sasanian Empire (224–651 CE). It appeared prominently on royal crowns, where it represented attributes such as piety, fertility, renewal, or divine favor associated with the moon god Mah in Zoroastrian tradition.

Sasanian kings each wore a distinctive personal crown, as documented on their coinage, rock reliefs, and metalwork. The crescent moon frequently featured as a decorative element, either alone, within wings, atop a mural crown, or combined with a korymbos (a globe or top-knot of hair covered in fabric), spheres, or stars. Examples include crowns of rulers such as Peroz I (r. 459–484), where the crescent appears within winged motifs, and later kings like Khosrow II (r. 590–628), where it became a standard feature. A golden ring from the Sasanian period depicts a king wearing a crown surmounted by a crescent moon and stepped crenellations. In some interpretations, the crescent symbolized the moon's guardianship over plants and livestock or balanced cosmic forces alongside solar motifs.

The crescent moon motif has deeper roots in Iranian and Near Eastern traditions. It appears on Parthian coins (247 BCE–224 CE), sometimes as a simplified "pellet within crescent" or alongside stars, often flanking the king's head or as part of royal emblems. Under kings like Orodes II (1st century BCE), star-and-crescent combinations emerged, possibly linked to Zoroastrian deities such as Mithra (associated with the star) and Anahita or Mah (linked to the crescent). The symbol continued into the Sasanian era, appearing on coin margins from the 5th century onward and signifying royal legitimacy, divine glory (khvarenah), or celestial order.

Beyond Iran, the crescent moon (sometimes with a disc or star) features in other ancient contexts. It occurs on coins of the Aksumite Kingdom (c. 100–940 CE), where early issues bore a crescent and disc symbolizing lunar and solar deities from South Arabian polytheism before the adoption of Christianity under King Ezana (4th century CE). In Iran, the motif also appears on the rock relief at Qal-e Gol Malekshahi (Gol Gol Malekshahi) in Ilam Province, dating to the Neo-Assyrian period (c. 9th–7th centuries BCE). This relief, associated with an Assyrian king or influence, includes astral symbols such as a crescent moon, reflecting broader Near Eastern iconography of celestial deities.

The crescent moon's use in pre-Islamic Iranian art underscores its role as a royal and religious emblem, distinct from its later associations in other cultures. It highlights continuity in astral symbolism from the Parthian through Sasanian periods, influencing representations of kingship and divine endorsement.

=== Derafsh Shahbaz ===
Derafsh Shahbaz, standard of Cyrus the Great

Derafsh Shahbaz, standard of Cyrus the Great (alternate version)

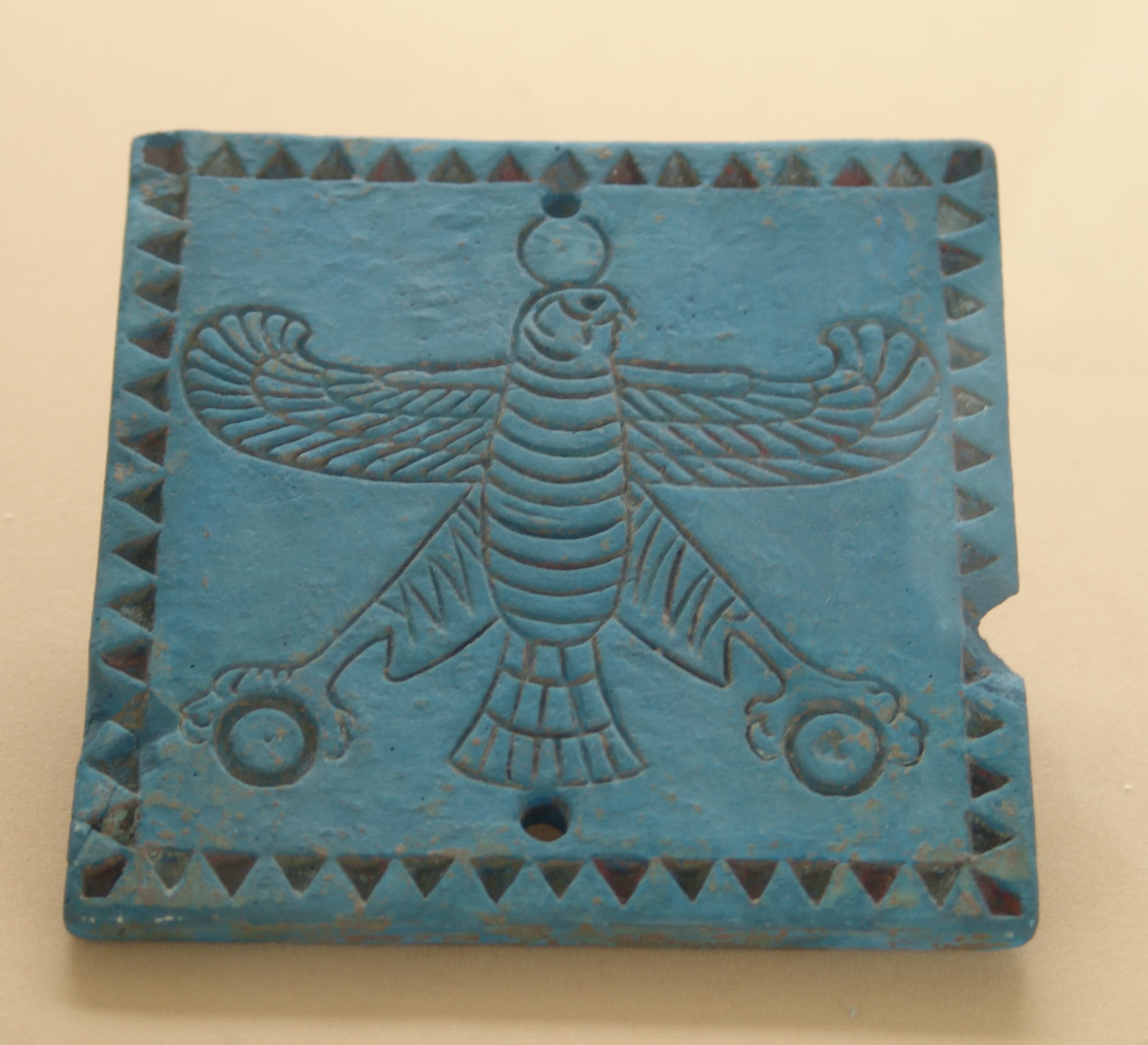
Achaemenid tile found in Persepolis with the image of Shahbaz

The Derafsh Shahbaz (Persian: درفش شهباز, lit. 'Royal Falcon Standard'), also known as the standard of Cyrus the Great, is traditionally regarded as the primary vexilloid (battle standard) of the Achaemenid Empire (c. 550–330 BCE).

Ancient sources, particularly Xenophon in his Cyropaedia (Book VII, Chapter 1), describe the Persian royal standard as a golden eagle with outspread wings, mounted atop a long spear-shaft. Xenophon notes: "...the standard was a golden eagle, with outspread wings, borne aloft on a long spear-shaft, and to this day such is the standard of the Persian king" (referring to the banner observed at the Battle of Cunaxa in 401 BCE under Artaxerxes II, though the description is applied retrospectively to earlier periods including Cyrus). This avian motif symbolized royal authority, divine protection, strength, and aggression, aligning with Persian practices of maintaining royal birds of prey.

In modern Iranian tradition and popular historiography, the standard is featuring a golden bird known as the Shahbaz (literally "royal falcon" or "king falcon" in Persian). The Shahbaz is a fabled bird in Persian mythology, described as resembling an eagle but larger than a hawk or falcon, said to inhabit mountainous regions such as the Zagros, Alborz, and Caucasus within Greater Iran. It was viewed as a protective deity or guiding spirit in ancient lore, sometimes linked to helping Iranian peoples or associated with the Faravahar. Archaeological finds at Persepolis, including plaques depicting a bird (often interpreted as a golden eagle or falcon with open wings), have been cited in support of this emblem as the Achaemenid imperial standard.

British Orientalist Richard Francis Burton, in his 1852 work Falconry in the Valley of the Indus, traced the inspiration for the Shahbaz symbol to the saker falcon (Falco cherrug), a large raptor common in the region and used in falconry. Some interpretations alternatively propose the golden eagle (Aquila chrysaetos) or even the eastern imperial eagle as the model, reflecting the bird's majestic and predatory qualities. Speculative connections have also been drawn to earlier archetypes, such as the ancient Egyptian deity Horus (often depicted as a falcon), though such links remain unsubstantiated.

The standard is depicted in modern reconstructions as a golden falcon (or eagle) with outstretched wings, sometimes holding spheres symbolizing dominion over earth and sky, or surmounted by solar motifs linked to Mithraic traditions. It is distinguished from unit-specific banners used by the Achaemenid army, which varied in style and shape.

== Mythical symbols ==
=== Mithraic sun & lion ===
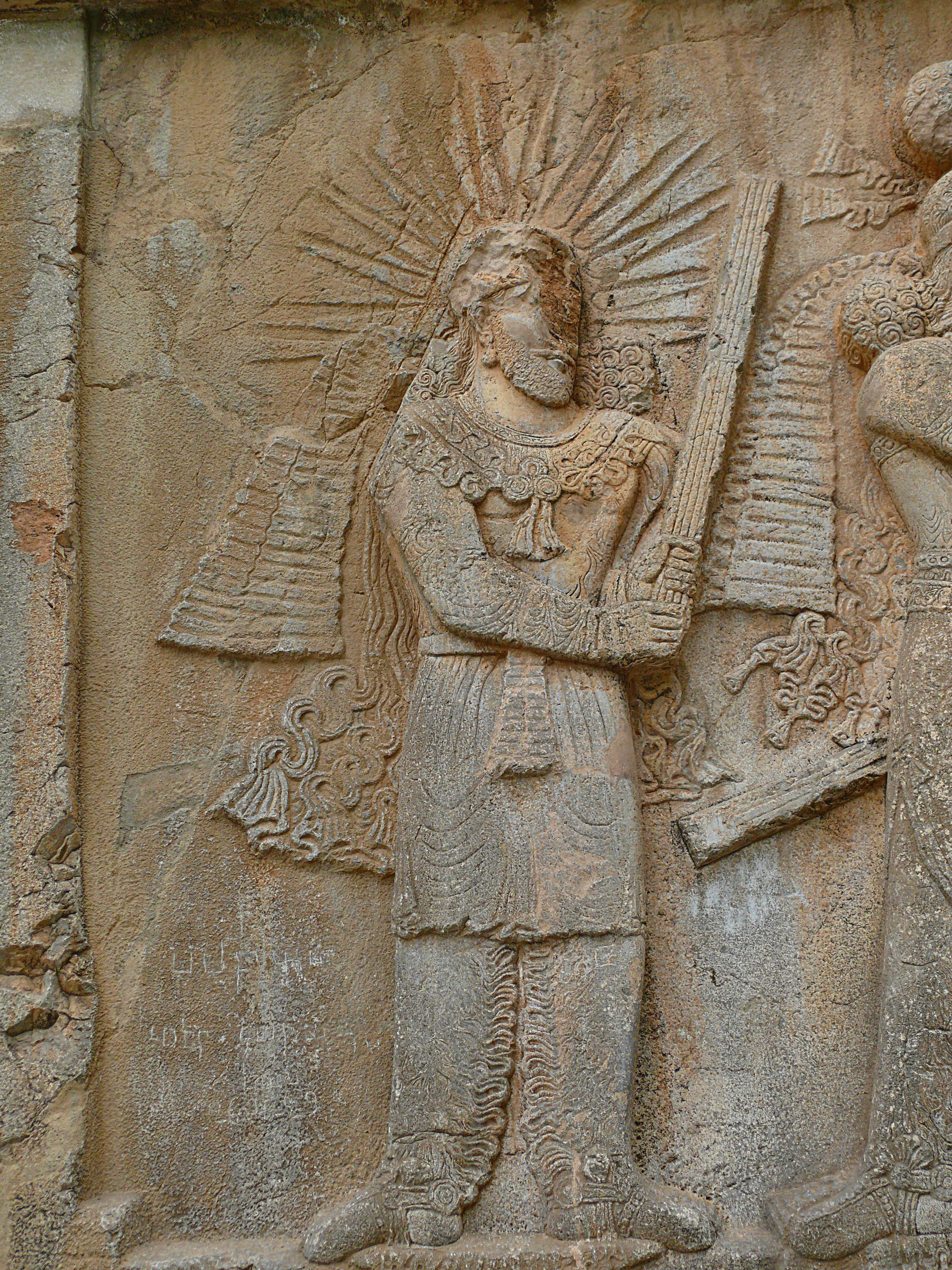
Mithra at the relief of Coronation of Ardashir II at Taq-e Bostan

Mithra was the sun god embodying contracts and mutual obligation. An adaptation of the type of Zeus seen as the all-observing entity that oversees everything, was revered as the most significant deity in the pre-Zoroastrian Iranian pantheon.

=== Anahita ===
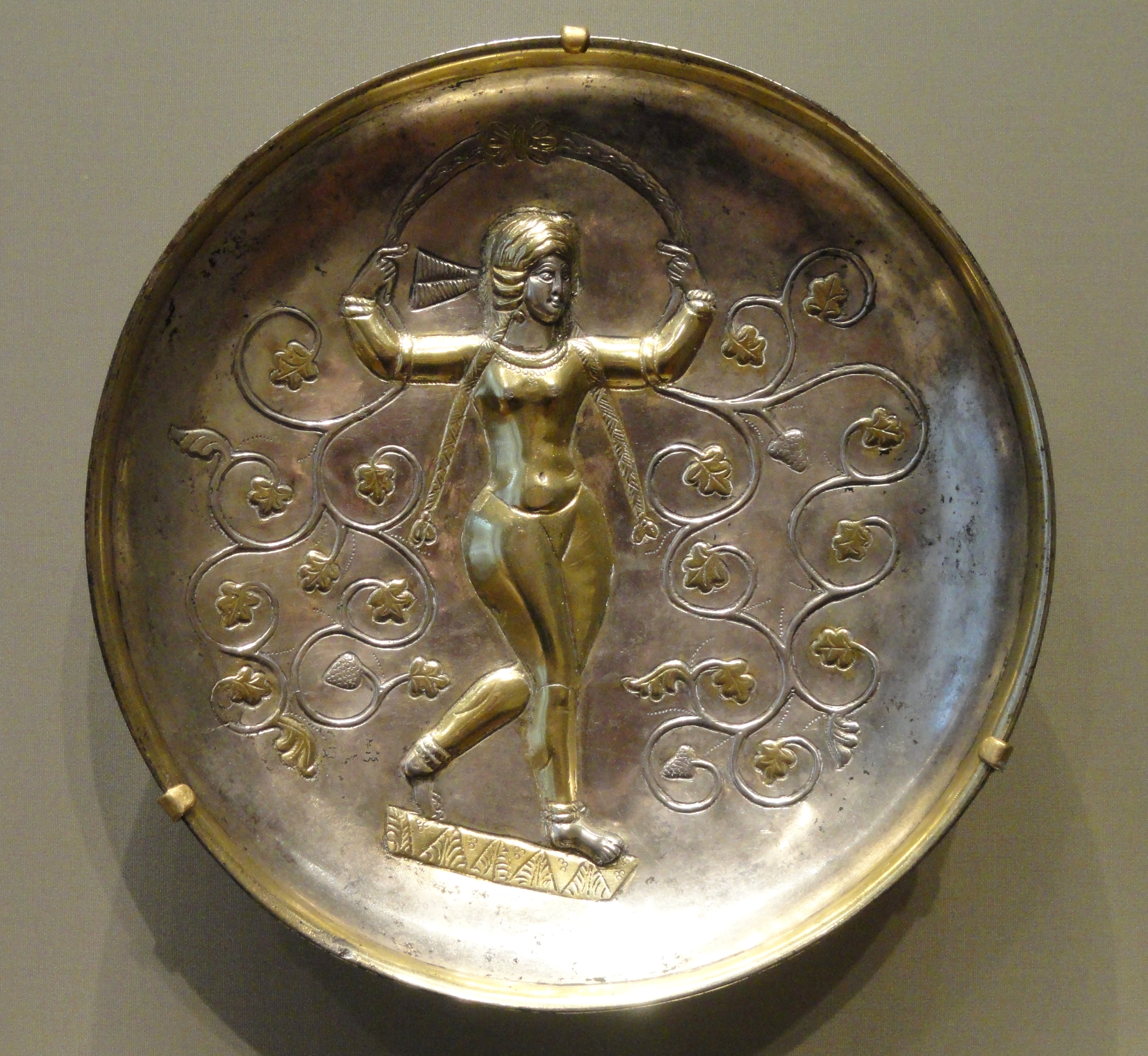
Anahita

Anahita (Old Persian: Anāhita; Avestan: Arədvī Sūrā Anāhitā, meaning "moist, strong, immaculate" or "the immaculate one") is an ancient Iranian goddess primarily venerated as the divinity of the Waters (Aban) in Zoroastrianism and pre-Zoroastrian Iranian religion. She is associated with fertility, healing, wisdom, and the life-giving properties of water, embodying the feminine creative principle. As a yazata (divine being worthy of worship) in Zoroastrian tradition, she is referenced in the Avesta, particularly in the Aban Yasht, which praises her as the guardian of all waters, rivers, lakes, seas, and the cosmic ocean, and the source of abundance, prosperity, and purification.

Anahita is described as a tall, strong, beautiful maiden of pure and undefiled nature, often portrayed as a virgin. She is said to drive a chariot drawn by four white horses representing the elemental forces of wind, rain, clouds, and sleet. Her iconography includes golden robes, a radiant diamond or jeweled crown (sometimes with eight rays and a hundred stars), square golden earrings, a golden necklace, and a mantle embroidered with gold and adorned with thirty otter skins (symbolizing her connection to waters). She frequently holds a water pitcher or the sacred plant baresma. In some depictions, she appears winged, crowned with stars, or accompanied by powerful lions (reflecting her role as a mistress of animals or Potnia Theron in certain syncretic traditions). She is also linked to war, granting victory and protection to warriors and kings, and serves as a patron of women, childbirth, sacred dance, and fertility.

Her sacred animals include the dove (symbolizing peace, purity, and love) and the peacock (associated with beauty, immortality, and divine splendor). The lotus flower is another prominent symbol connected to her.

Anahita held immense reverence in ancient Iran across the Achaemenid, Parthian, and Sasanian periods, often ranking among the most popular deities alongside Ahura Mazda and Mithra. She was invoked for fertility of the land, purification of seeds and wombs, milk for newborns, and success in battle. In royal investiture scenes (such as at Taq-e Bostan under Khosrow II), she is shown bestowing the ring of kingship, signifying divine endorsement of sovereignty. Her cult extended beyond Iran to places like Armenia (as Anahit), where she was equated with aspects of Greek Aphrodite or Artemis, and influenced neighboring cultures through syncretism.

Though Zoroaster's reforms subordinated lesser deities under Ahura Mazda, Anahita retained a prominent role as a powerful yazata, daughter-like figure to the supreme god, and protector of creation. Her worship persisted into the Sasanian era and left a lasting legacy in Iranian cultural and mythological traditions, where she represents purity, nurturing power, and the vital force of water.

=== Simurgh ===
Simurgh emblem in the Sasanian era

The Simurgh (Persian: سیمرغ; Avestan: Saēna meregha, "the mighty bird") is a central mythical bird in ancient Iranian mythology and literature, It symbolizes divine benevolence, cosmic harmony, protection, renewal, and the union of heaven and earth.

In ancient Iranian and Zoroastrian tradition, the Simurgh represents the mediator between the divine and material realms. Perched atop the sacred Tree of All Seeds on Mount Alborz, it purifies waters and earth, brings fertility, and guards creation, embodying renewal, abundance, and the eternal cycle of life. Its extreme antiquity (having witnessed the world's destruction and rebirth three times) symbolizes timeless wisdom, immortality, and transcendent knowledge.

Its composite form, a gigantic bird with peacock wings (beauty and splendor), scaled body, dog head (loyalty), lion claws (strength), and sometimes a human face, signifies wholeness, the integration of opposites, and a supreme being that transcends ordinary boundaries.

In Ferdowsi's Shahnameh (Book of Kings), the Simurgh acts as a divine protector and nurturer of heroes (raising Zal, aiding Rostam's birth and healing), symbolizing divine favor, royal legitimacy, and the guardianship of Iranian destiny.

Across Persian miniature paintings, reliefs, tiles, and decorative arts (from Achaemenid times through the Islamic period), the Simurgh is portrayed as radiant and majestic, often with outstretched wings and luminous plumage, reinforcing its status as an emblem of royal glory, cosmic order, safeguarding of the nation, hope, and the enduring vitality of Iranian heritage.

The Simurgh remains a powerful national and cultural symbol in Iran, representing protection, wisdom, divine endorsement of just rule, the life-affirming forces of nature, and the timeless quest for harmony between the earthly and celestial realms.

=== Griffin (Shihrdal) ===
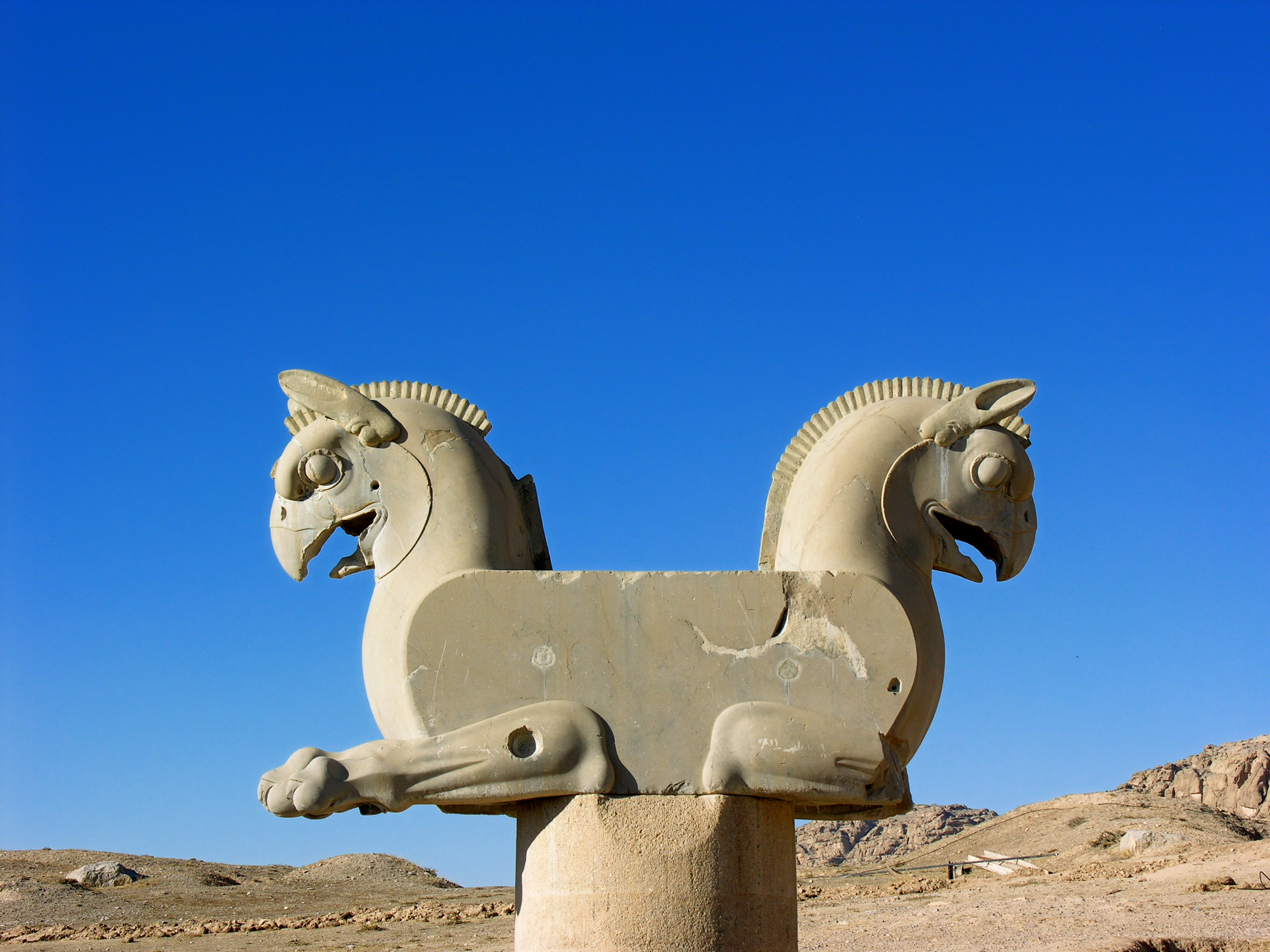
Shihrdal

The Shihrdal or Griffin (Persian: شیردال, romanized: širdāl, lit. 'lion-eagle'; Middle Persian: bashkuch) is a mythical hybrid creature in ancient Iranian tradition, featuring the body of a lion combined with the head and wings of an eagle (occasionally with horse ears or a mane in variant depictions). It symbolizes the supreme ruler of the animal kingdom (lion as king of beasts) and the avian realm (eagle as king of birds), representing unmatched power, majesty, vigilance, and dominion.

In ancient Iranian art and mythology, from Elamite, Luristan bronze artifacts, Achaemenid reliefs (e.g., at Persepolis), through Parthian and Sasanian periods, the Shihrdal served as a potent guardian symbol. It protected treasures, gold mines, sacred spaces, and royal domains from evil spirits, misfortune, slander, witchcraft, and demonic influences. Positioned near the Tree of Life or in apotropaic roles, it embodied divine protection, prosperity, happiness, royal authority, and the harmonious union of earthly strength (lion) with celestial swiftness, vision, and supremacy (eagle). This motif reflects broader Near Eastern traditions of composite guardians, with roots possibly in Mesopotamia or Central Asia from the 3rd, 4th millennium BCE.

The Shihrdal's symbolism influenced later interpretations: in medieval European contexts, the griffin represented courage, leadership, military strength, and nobility in heraldry (appearing rampant on coats of arms, shields, and noble family emblems). It also signified monogamous fidelity and lifelong marital loyalty (the survivor never remarrying after a mate's death). In Christian iconography, it symbolized Christ's dual nature, eagle for divinity and ascension, lion for humanity and earthly power, guarding sacred truths and churches. The Republic of Genoa adopted it as an emblem of maritime strength and commercial protection in the Middle Ages.

In Iranian cultural heritage, the Shihrdal remains a timeless emblem of combined terrestrial and celestial power, wisdom, guardianship, and royal legitimacy, appearing in reliefs, seals, and decorative arts as a protector of Iran's ancient grandeur and divine order. It underscores themes of vigilance, ferocity tempered by nobility, and the safeguarding of wealth, knowledge, and sovereignty across millennia.

=== Huma ===
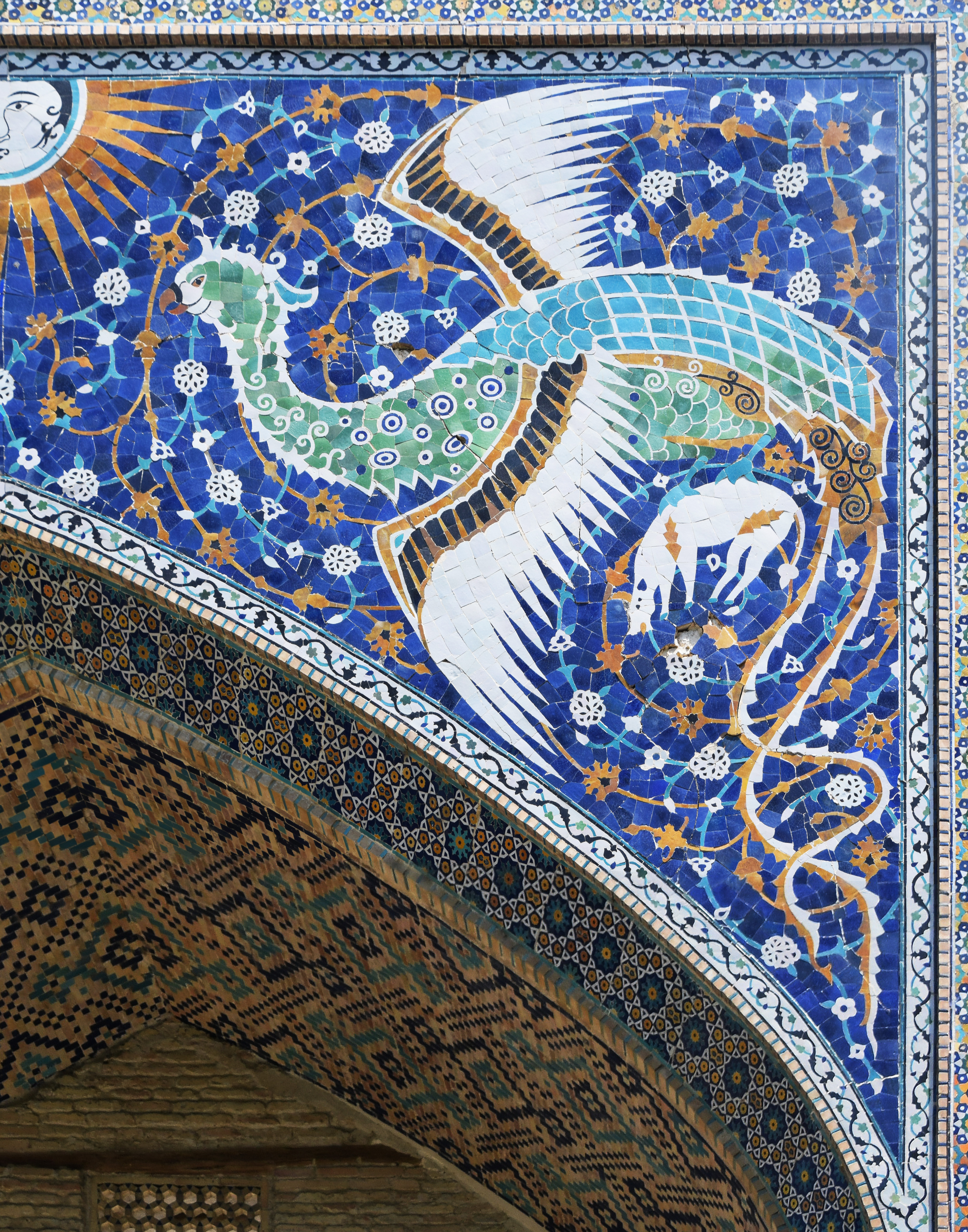
Mosaic of the mythical Huma bird on the portal of Nadir Divan-Begi Madrasa in Bukhara, Uzbekistan

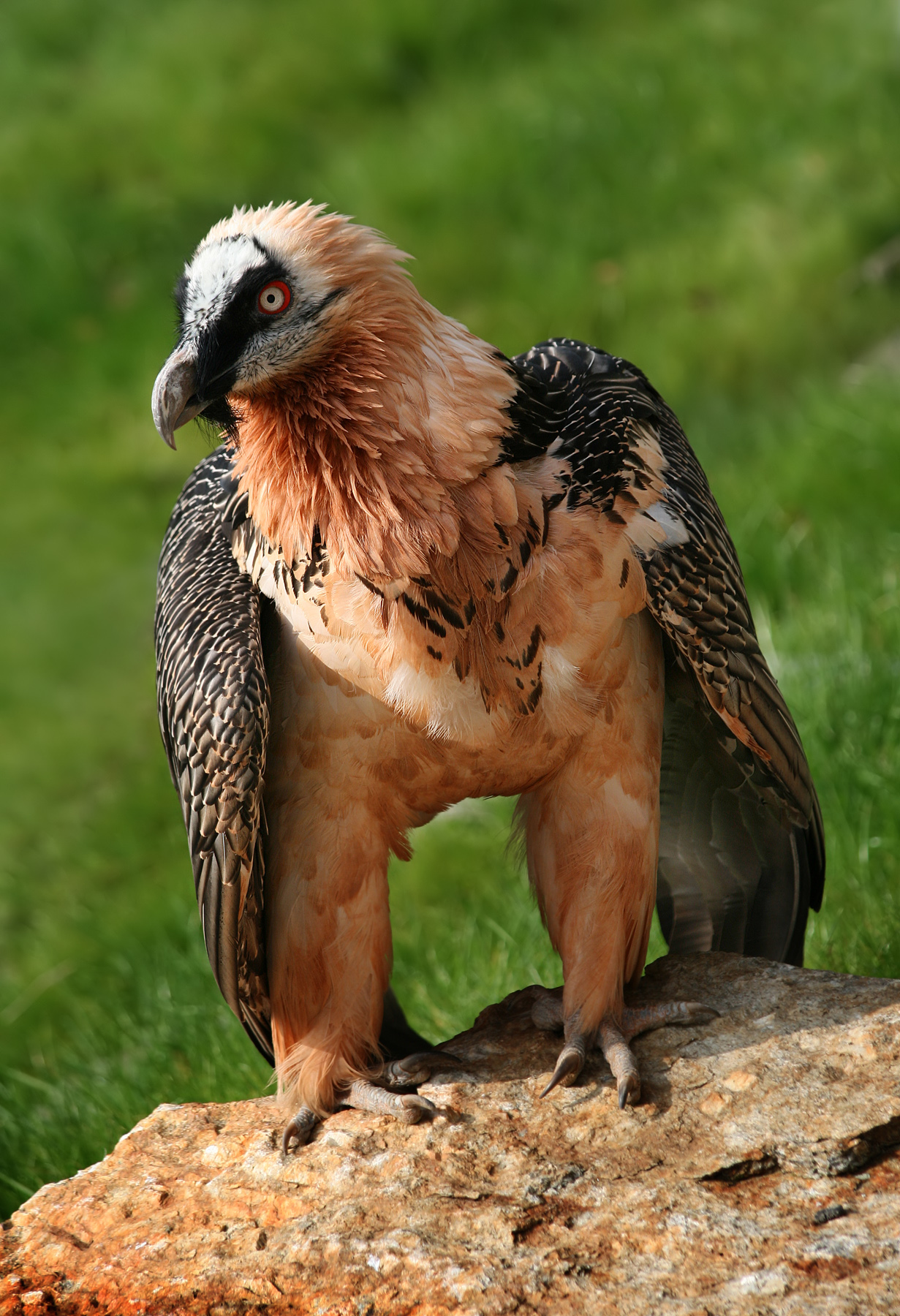
The lammergeier is a very large bird of prey. It is morphologically similar to depictions of the Huma bird.

The Huma (Persian: هما, romanized: Homâ), also known as Homay-e Sa'adat ("Huma of Happiness"), is a mythical bird in Iranian legends and folklore, deeply rooted in ancient Persian mythology and culture, It is celebrated as a symbol of fortune, happiness, prosperity, divine favor, and royal legitimacy.

In Iranian tradition, the Huma is depicted as a benevolent, majestic bird that never lands on the ground, spending its entire life in eternal flight high above the earth, often invisibly or at great heights. A core belief holds that if its shadow falls upon a person (or if it perches on their head), that individual will attain lifelong happiness, success, good fortune, and even kingship or sovereignty. This association with farr (divine glory) and auspicious rule made it a potent emblem of legitimate authority and national blessing. Kings and rulers in ancient Iran were said to adorn their turbans or regalia with feathers attributed to the Huma to signify this divine endorsement.

The bird is often described as harmless and noble: it feeds only on bones (earning it the title of a bone-eater that harms no living creature), contrasting with predatory birds and reinforcing its purity and kindness. In some accounts, it exhibits phoenix-like qualities, renewing itself through fire and rebirth, symbolizing immortality, renewal, and eternal life, sometimes called the "Bird of Paradise." It is portrayed as androgynous or hermaphroditic in certain variants (possessing both male and female traits, or one wing and one leg each), evoking wholeness and balance.

The Huma's origins trace to pre-Islamic Iranian beliefs, with possible links to Zoroastrian reverence for sacred birds as omens of good fortune and celestial benevolence. Its image appears in Achaemenid art, such as carvings and columns at Persepolis, underscoring its antiquity and role in royal iconography. In Persian proverbs and myths, it stands opposite to ill-omened birds like the owl, embodying joy and auspiciousness. Harm or killing the Huma was considered gravely taboo, with legends warning that the perpetrator would die within forty days.

The bird inspired real-world reverence, the bearded vulture (Gypaetus barbatus), known in Persian as homâ and native to Iran's high mountains (Alborz and Zagros), likely influenced the myth due to its bone-eating habits, rarity, and majestic soaring flight. This connection reinforced beliefs in its protective, purifying role, ancient Zoroastrians, who exposed bodies in high places, viewed the bird's consumption as aiding the soul's peaceful transition.

=== Rakhsh ===
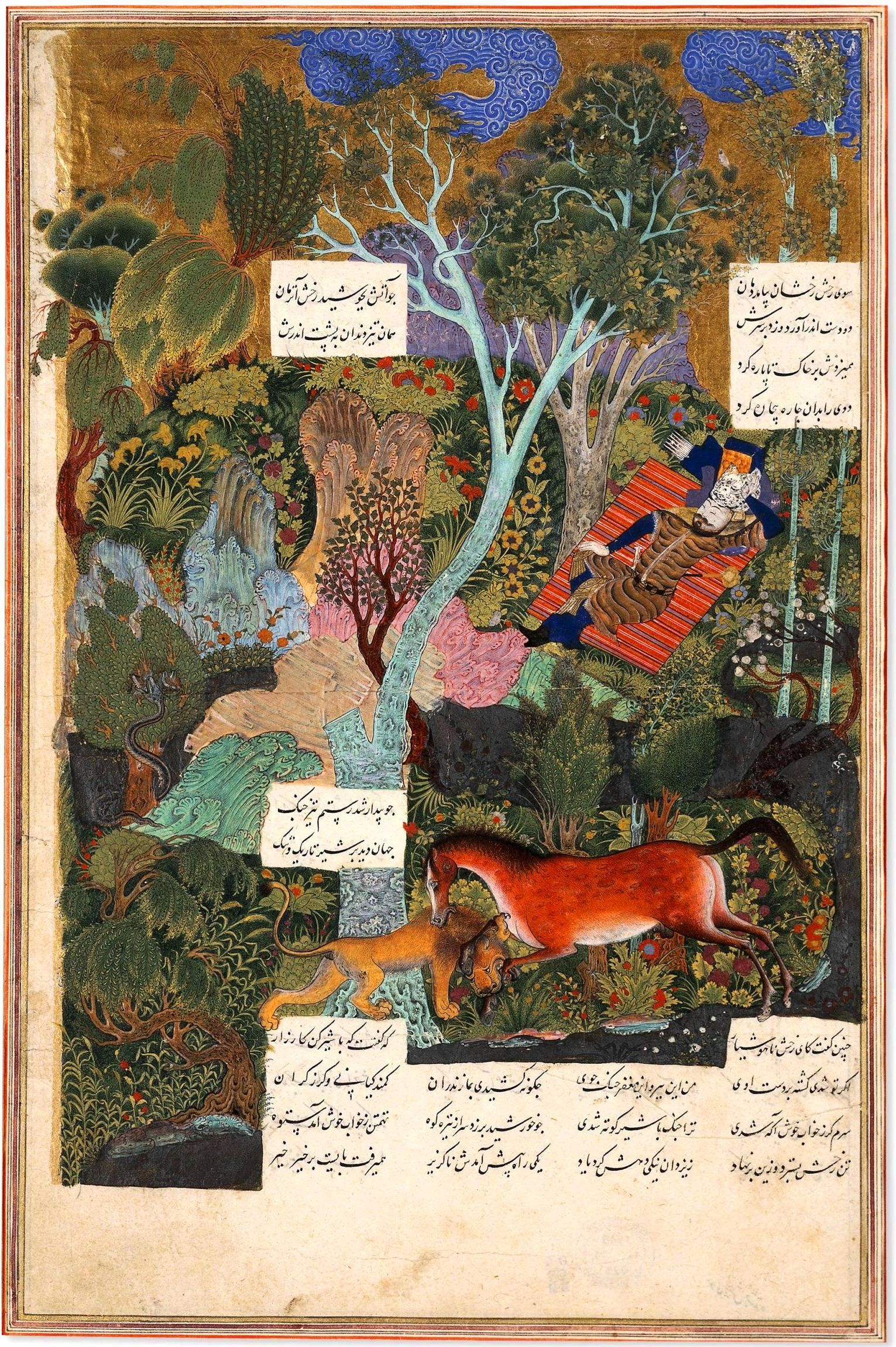
Rakhsh

Rakhsh (Persian: رخش, romanized: Raxš) is the legendary stallion and faithful companion of the hero Rostam in Ferdowsi's epic poem Shahnameh (Book of Kings), the national epic of Iran.

The name "Rakhsh" derives from Middle Persian and Proto-Iranian roots meaning "luminous," "bright," or "shining" (related to concepts of light or brilliance), evoking the horse's radiant and striking appearance. Some interpretations also associate it with "lightning" or "thunder" due to its swiftness and power.

The horse's distinctive coat is poetically described in the Shahnameh as "rose leaves that have been scattered upon a saffron ground" (or "rose petals mottled on saffron"), suggesting a luminous, dappled pattern of red (or rose-pink) flecks or spots against a golden-yellow or saffron background, often interpreted as a strawberry roan or piebald bay hue blending red and golden tones. This vivid coloration, combined with his imposing build, underscores his otherworldly strength, beauty, and heroic stature.

Rakhsh is renowned for his intelligence, bravery, and legendary loyalty, he recognizes no master but Rostam, fights alongside him in countless battles (including slaying a lion while Rostam sleeps), communicates with his rider, and endures great trials. He participates in key episodes, such as Rostam's rescue from captivity in Samangan and battles against formidable foes like Esfandiyar (where both are gravely wounded and healed by the Simurgh's feather).

In the tragic conclusion of Rostam's saga, Rakhsh and his master are fatally ambushed and killed by Shaghad (Rostam's envious half-brother) in a pit lined with spears, symbolizing betrayal and the end of an era of heroic glory.

Rakhsh embodies ideals central to Iranian heritage: unwavering fidelity, unmatched prowess, and the inseparable bond between hero and steed. He remains an iconic figure in Persian literature, art (especially miniatures depicting his dappled form in dynamic battle scenes), and cultural memory, representing the pinnacle of equine nobility and partnership in the defense of Iran.

=== Phoenix ===
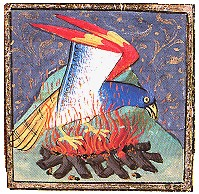
Phoenix

The Phoenix (Persian: ققنوس, romanized: Qoqnus), also known as the Persian phoenix, is a sacred mythical bird appearing in Iranian traditions as well as in Greek, Egyptian, and Chinese mythologies. In Persian sources, it is depicted as a rare, solitary creature without mate or offspring, embodying themes of immortality, cyclical renewal, sacrifice, and rebirth.

According to classical Persian lexicographical works such as the Dehkhoda Dictionary (drawing from the Borhan-e Qate'), the phoenix lives for a thousand years. At the end of its lifespan, it gathers firewood, sits atop the pile, sings melodiously until intoxicated or enraptured, flaps its wings to spark flames (or ignites the fire with its beak in ecstasy), and burns itself along with the wood. From the ashes emerges an egg (or the reborn bird itself), signifying eternal regeneration. Its beautiful song is said to be the origin of music, and some traditions attribute healing properties to its tears, capable of curing even deep wounds such as those from swords.

In ancient Iranian mythology, the Qoqnus shares conceptual overlaps with other legendary birds like the Simurgh (sometimes equated or compared in legends, where the Simurgh occasionally plunges into flames for rebirth in variant tales), though they remain distinct: the Simurgh is more often a benevolent guardian and healer tied to heroes and cosmic order, while the Qoqnus emphasizes solitary self-immolation and phoenix-like resurrection. The motif likely entered Persian culture through cultural exchanges with neighboring civilizations, possibly tracing roots to ancient Egyptian traditions (via the Bennu bird, associated with the sun, creation, and periodic rebirth every 500 years) before spreading to Greece and Rome (as the classical phoenix) and influencing later Iranian lore.

The phoenix symbolizes endurance through destruction, the triumph of life over death, purity, and the eternal cycle of existence. In Persian literature and folklore, it appears as a metaphor for unattainable perfection, poetic inspiration, and spiritual or national revival. Though less central to epic narratives like Ferdowsi's Shahnameh (where the Simurgh dominates heroic tales), the Qoqnus endures in poetic and mystical contexts as an emblem of transcendent beauty, self-sacrifice, and hope amid adversity.

It remains a potent symbol in Iranian cultural heritage, representing resilience, artistic creation (linked to its enchanting voice), and the promise of renewal after hardship.

== Nature and living beings ==
=== Persian Gulf ===
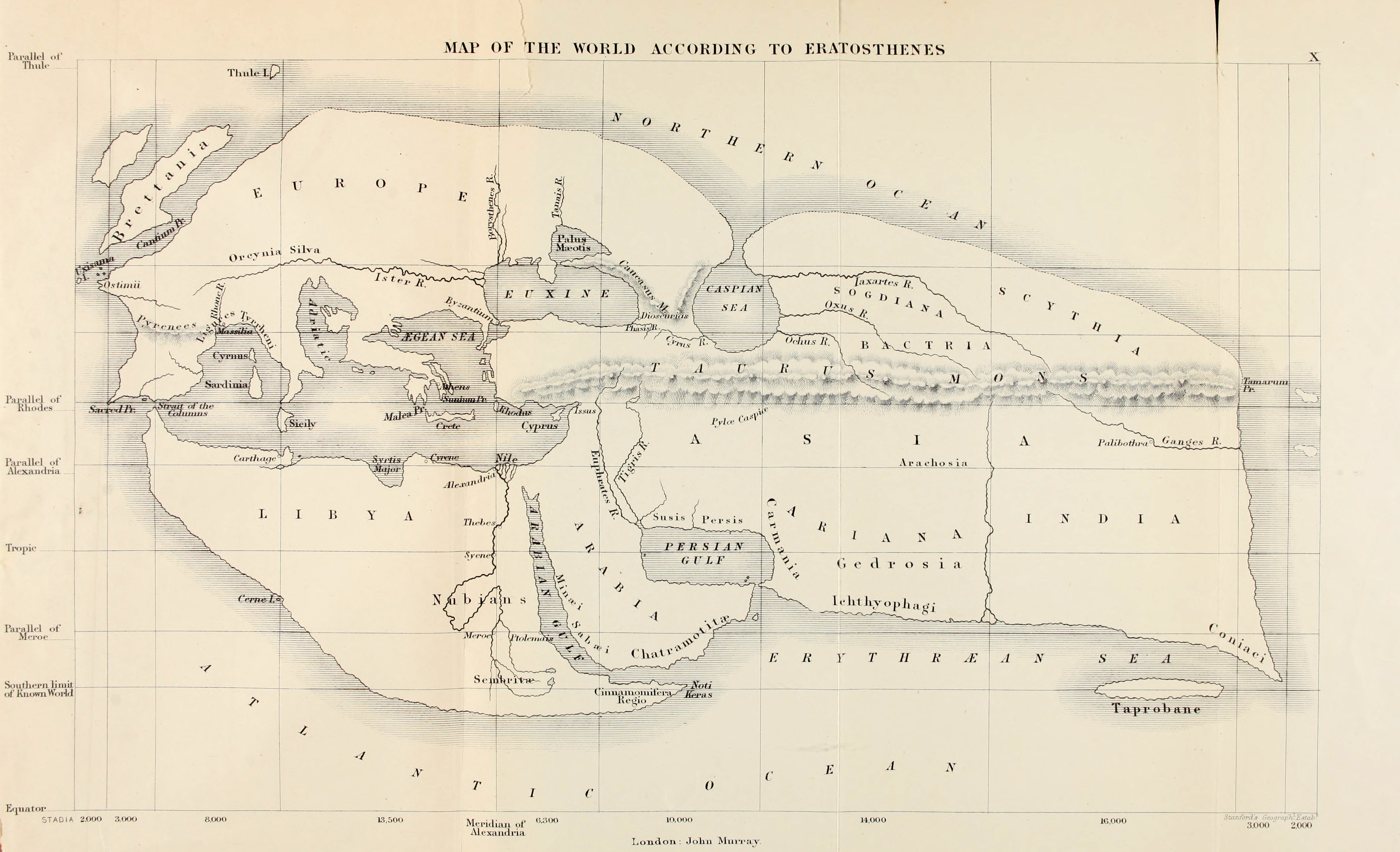
Reconstructed map from Eratosthenes' geography (194 BCE), naming Iran as Ariana and the gulf as Persian Gulf—the first foreign writer to do so.

The Persian Gulf is a mediterranean sea in Western Asia. It is an extension of the Arabian Sea and part of the Indian Ocean, located between Iran and the Arabian Peninsula. The gulf connects to the Gulf of Oman in the east via the Strait of Hormuz, while the Shatt al-Arab delta forms its northwestern coast. The historical name of this body of water has long been associated with the land of Iran, and in various languages it has been translated or rendered as equivalent to "Persian Gulf" or "Persian Sea." It is officially designated as the "Persian Gulf" by all international organizations, and the International Hydrographic Organization uses "Gulf of Iran (Persian Gulf)" as an equivalent. In recent decades, some Arab countries have attempted to alter the name of the Persian Gulf for political reasons.

=== Mountains ===
==== Alborz mountain range ====
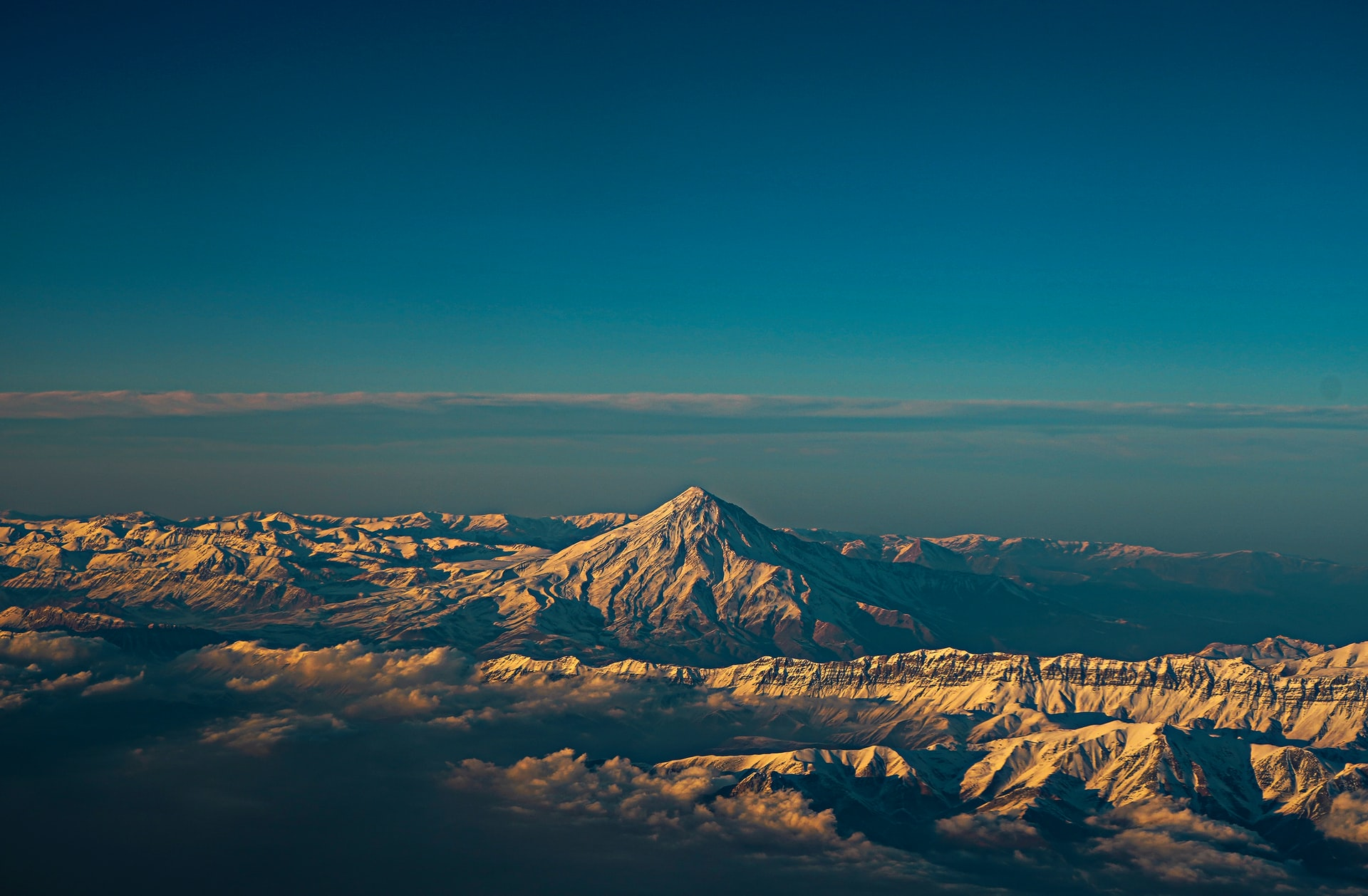
Sunset over Damavand

The Alborz mountain range and peaks such as Mount Damavand, particularly Qarn Kuh in Mazandaran province, feature prominently in historical texts on Tabaristan and in Iranian mythology. In ancient legends, the Alborz range is referred to as "Tirag," a term also noted in the glossary of the book Sushyans. According to Iranian beliefs, the sacred Mount Alborz is situated at the center of the earth and connects to the heavens. An ancient tradition holds that the birth of Mithra occurred from lightning striking two stones on Mount Alborz. The Chinvat Bridge, which in ancient Iranian belief the souls of the dead must cross to reach paradise or hell, is also located in the Alborz. In terms of natural geography, mountains have been fundamental in Iran; without them, there would be no water or forests, and the Iranian Plateau would not have formed as it did. The inaccessibility and multifaceted significance of the Alborz have given it profound meaning for Iranians across the periods of Mithraism, Zoroastrianism, and Islam.

===== Mount Damavand =====
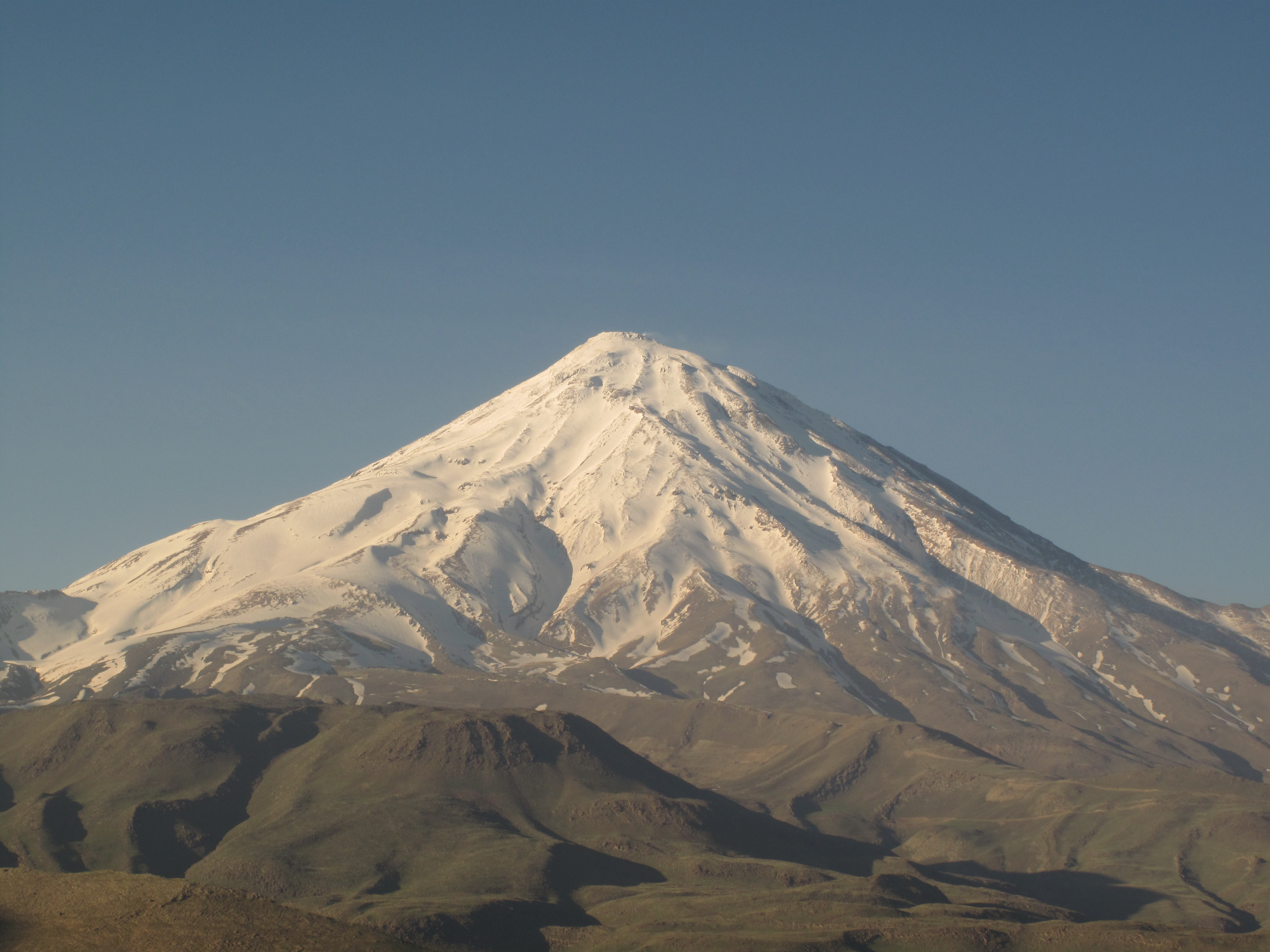
Mount Damavand, a national symbol of Iran

Mount Damavand is the highest mountain peak in Iran and the entire Middle East, located in the Alborz range in Mazandaran province. It is an active volcano and holds great prominence in Iranian myths and folk tales. The mountain is regarded as a symbol of Iran's enduring resistance against foreign rule. Mount Damavand appears on the reverse side of Iran's 10,000-rial banknote. In Iranian mythology, Damavand occupies a special place. Its fame stems largely from the legend in which the mythical hero Fereydun chained the tyrant Zahhak in a cave there. Zahhak remains imprisoned there until the end of time, when his bonds will break, he will begin slaying humanity, and will ultimately be killed by Garshasp. Even today, some local residents near the mountain believe Zahhak is imprisoned in Damavand and attribute certain sounds from the mountain to his groans.

=== Wildlife ===
The wildlife of Iran was first partially described in the 14th century by Hamdallah Mustawfi, who focused on animals. In the 18th and 19th centuries, Samuel Gottlieb Gmelin and Édouard Ménétries explored the Caspian Sea region and Talysh Mountains to document Caspian fauna. These efforts were continued by several naturalists, including Filippo De Filippi, William Thomas Blanford, and Nikolai Zarudny, who recorded species of mammals, birds, reptiles, amphibians, and fish.

=== Iranian mammals ===
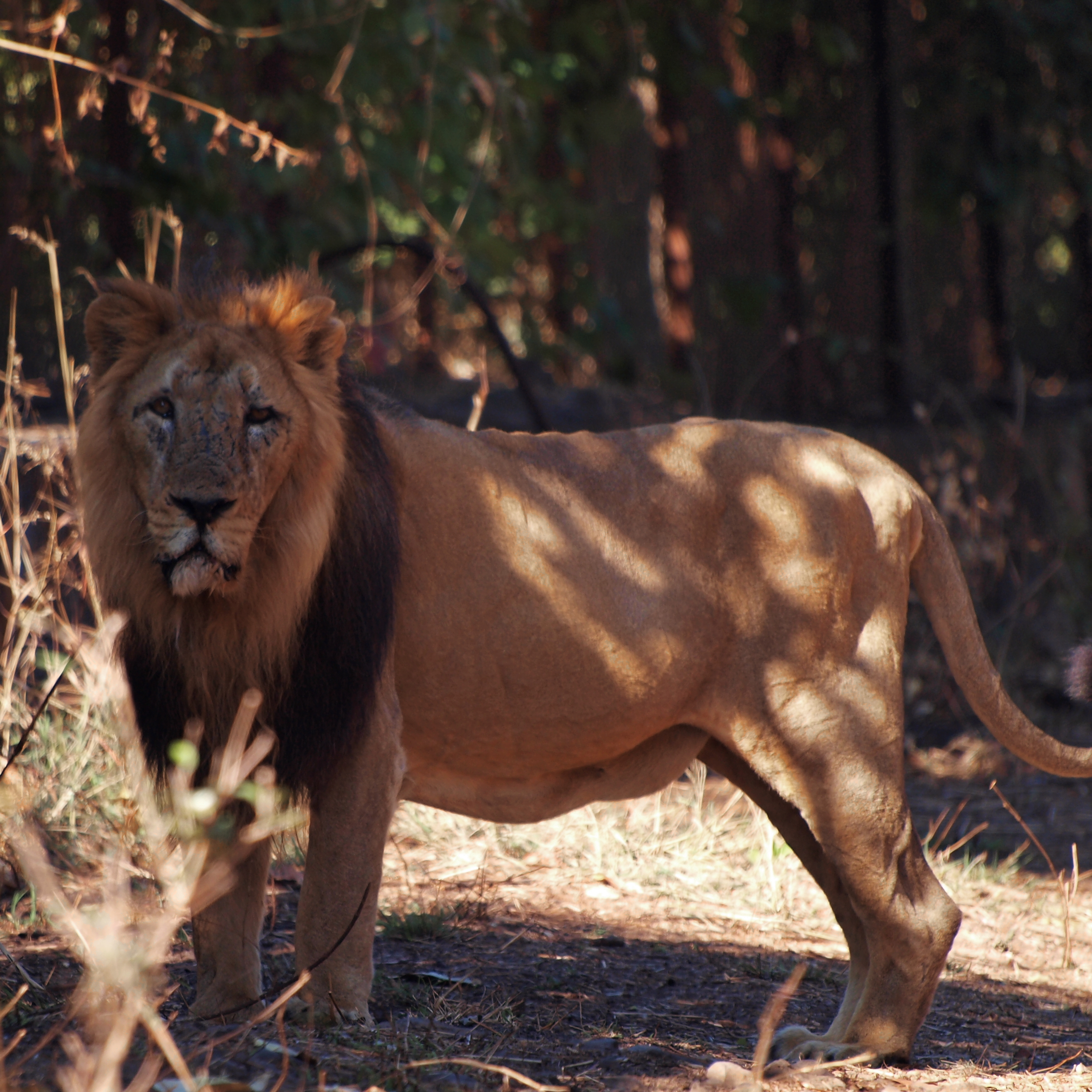
Asiatic lion

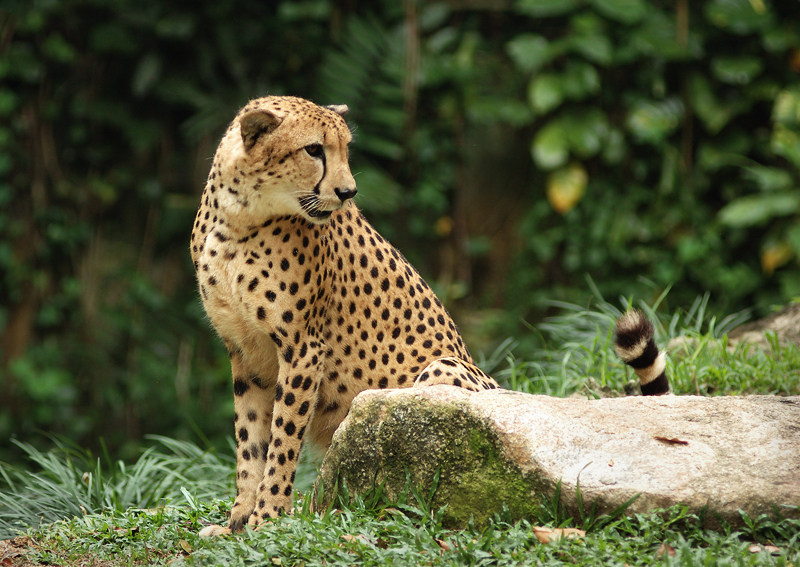
Asiatic cheetah

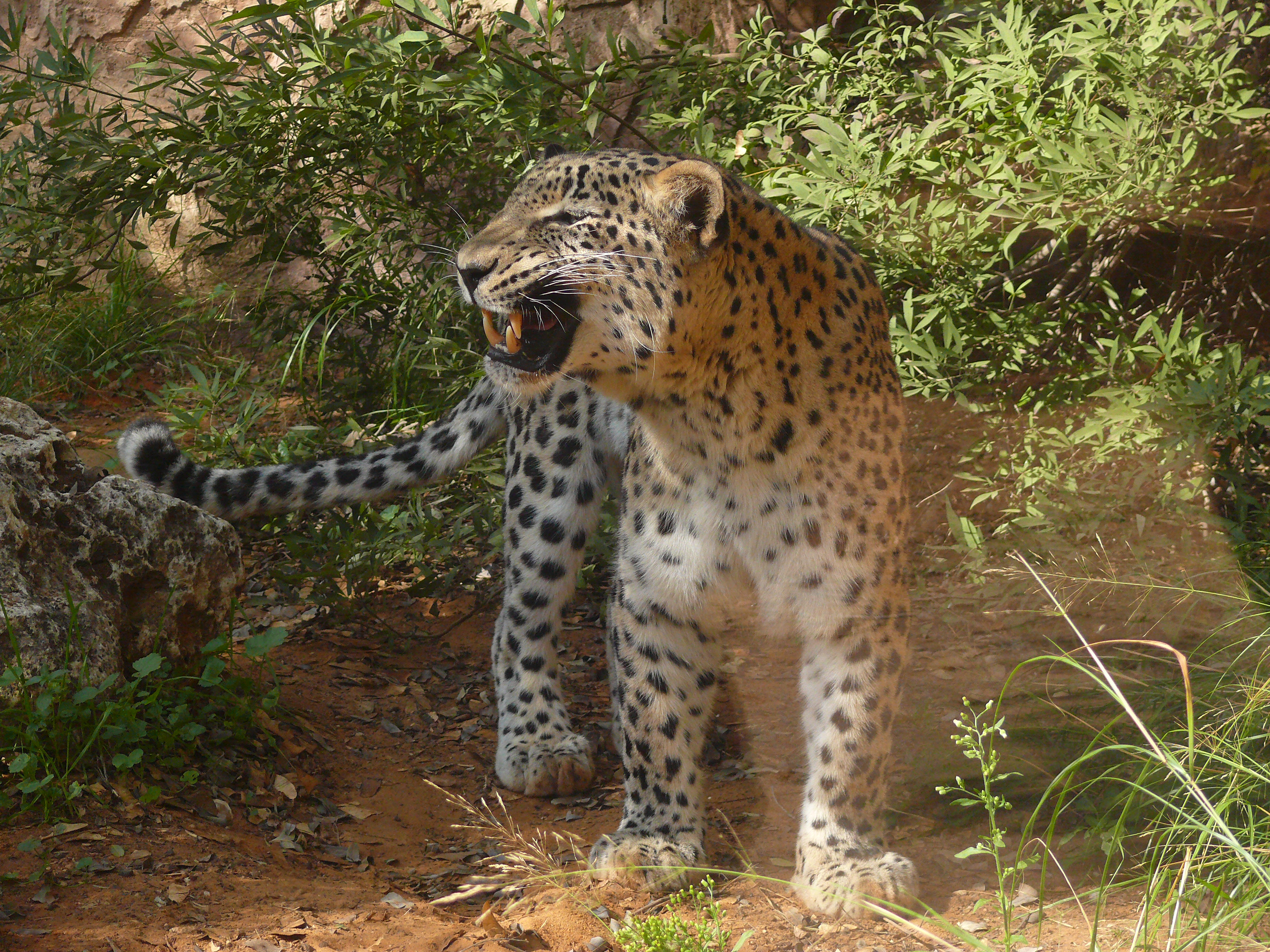
Persian leopard

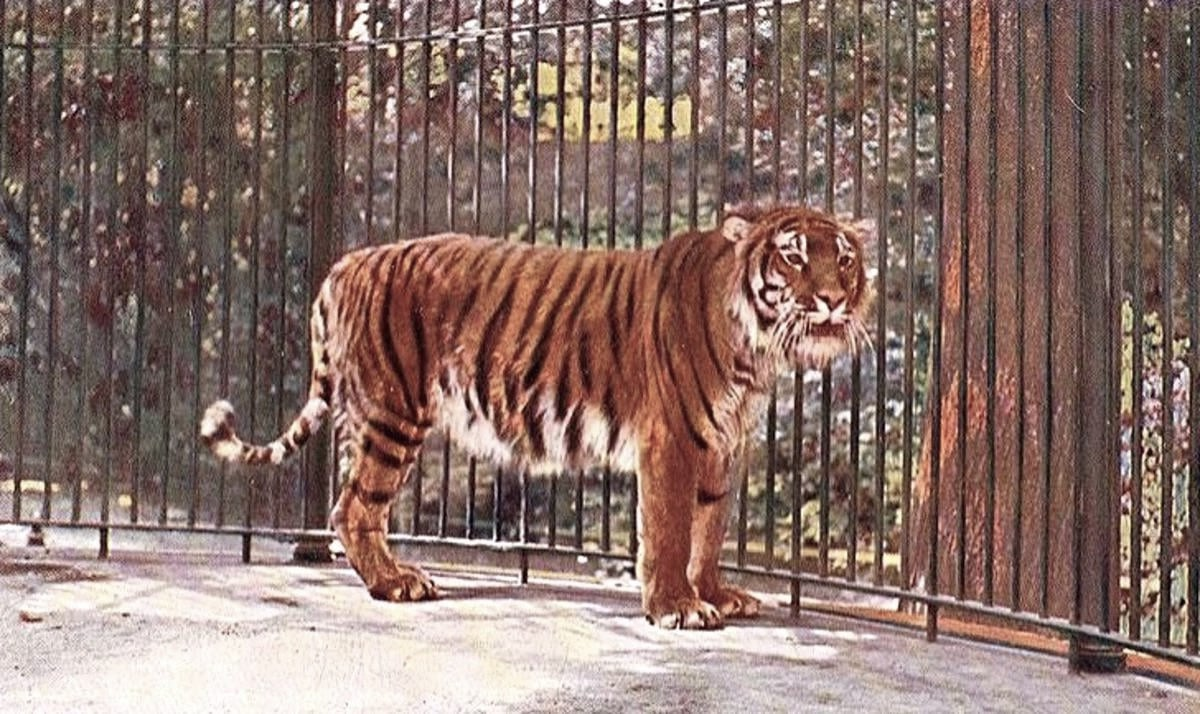
Caspian tiger

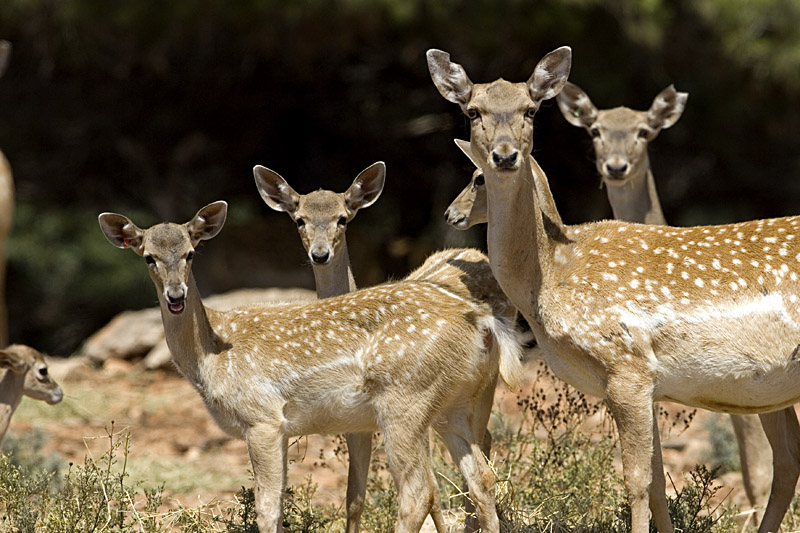
Persian fallow deer

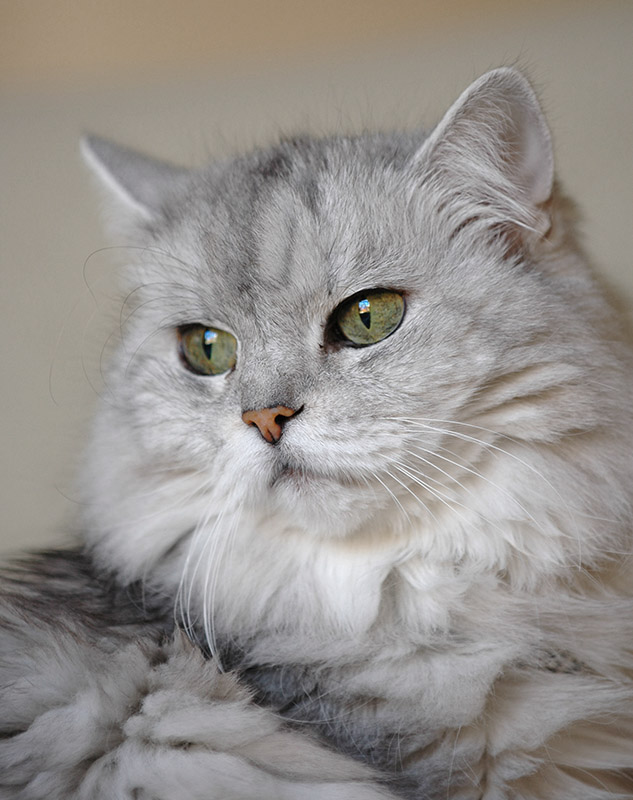
Persian cat

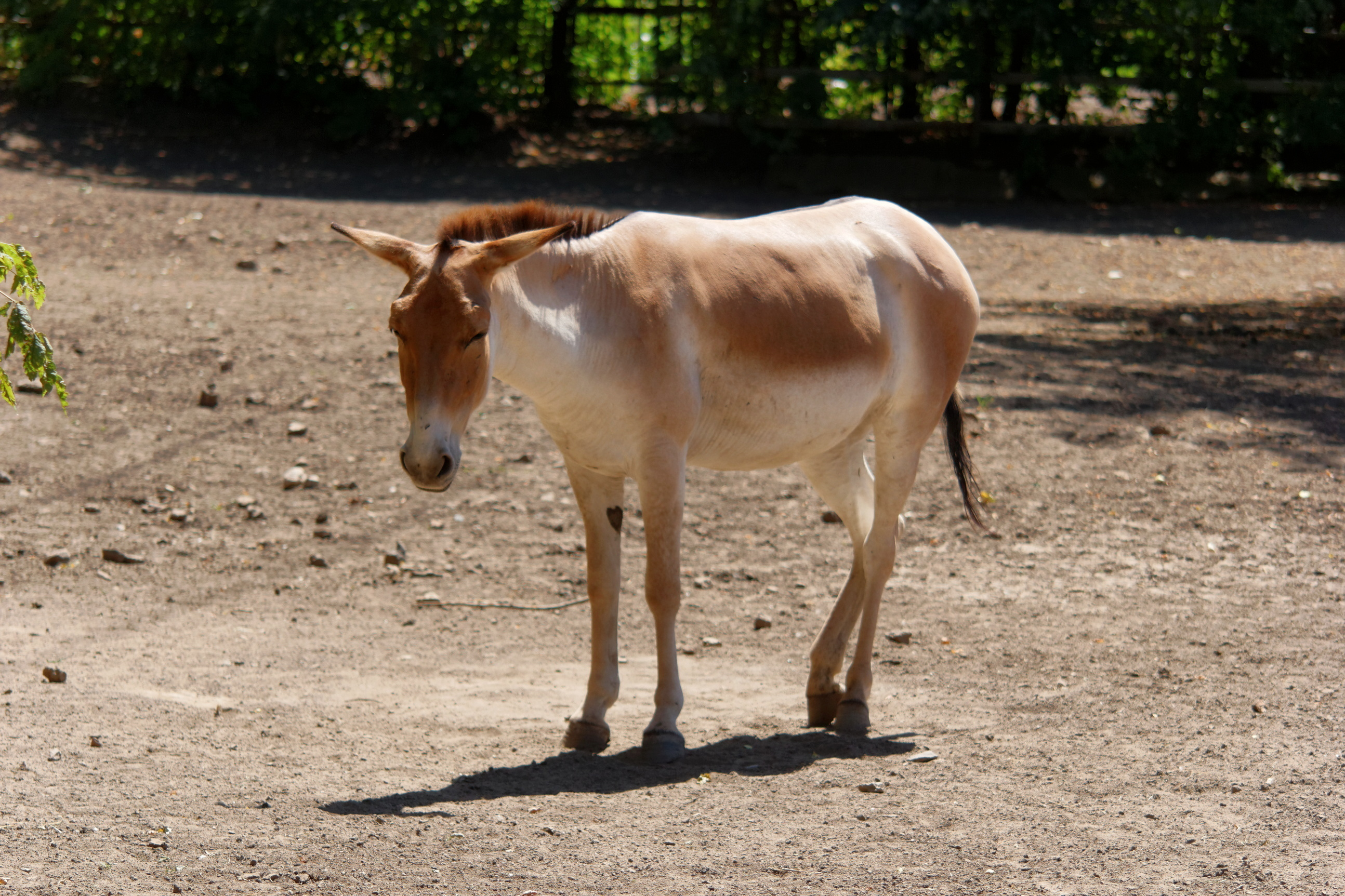
Persian onager

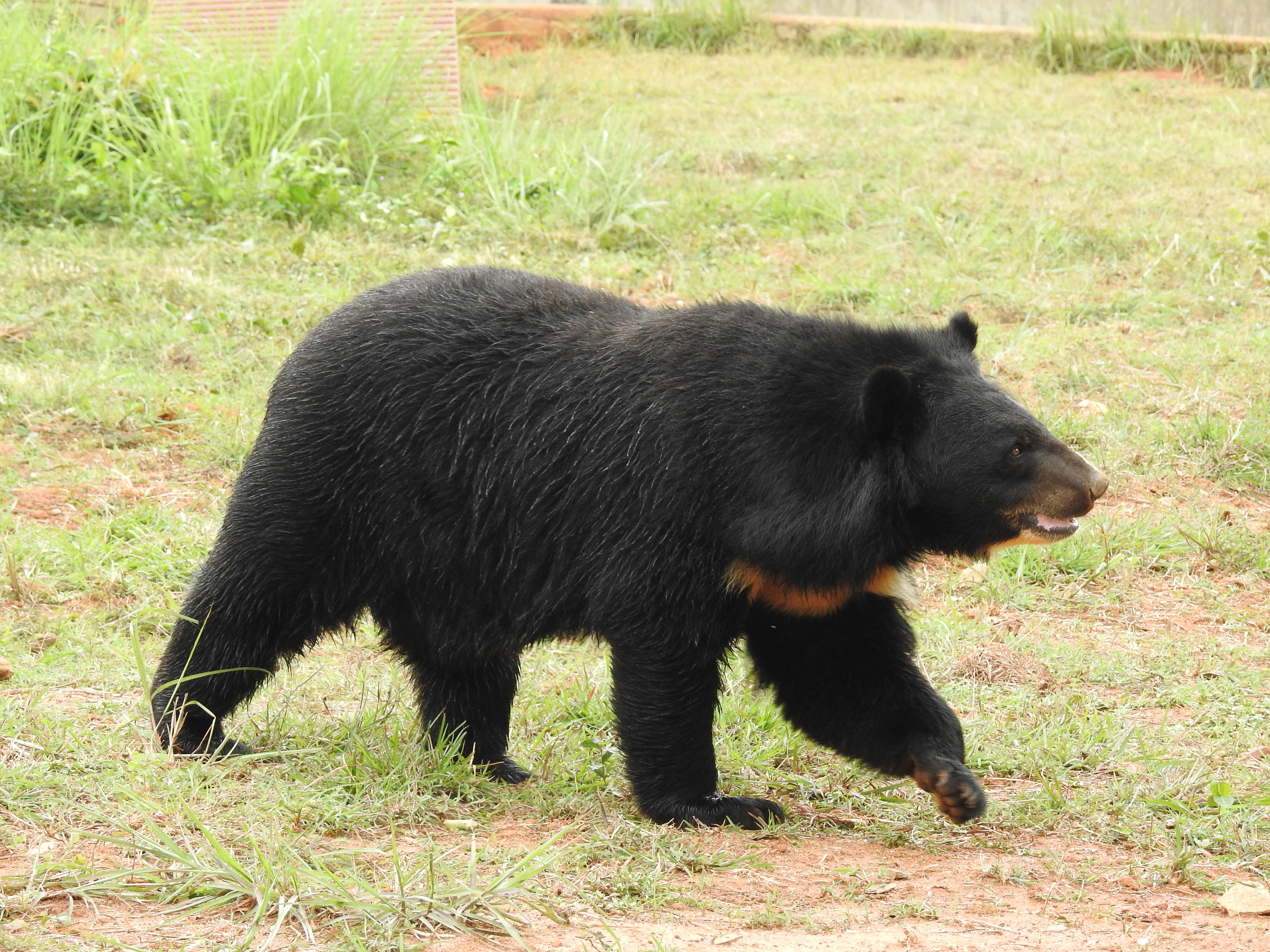
Asian black bear

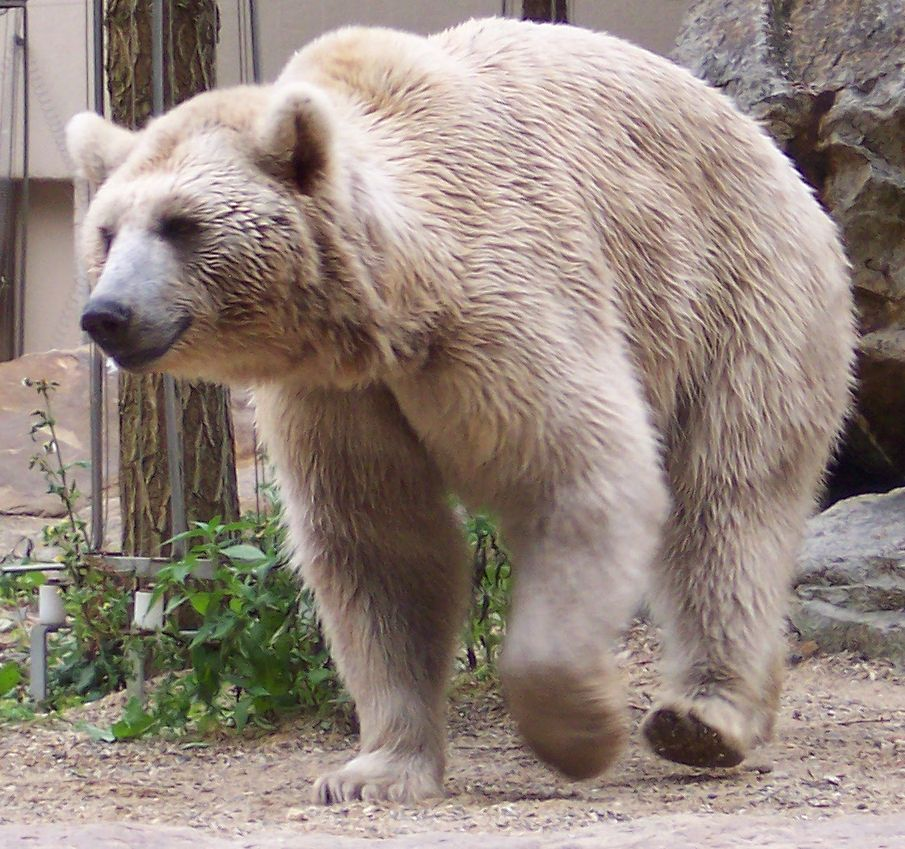
Syrian brown bear

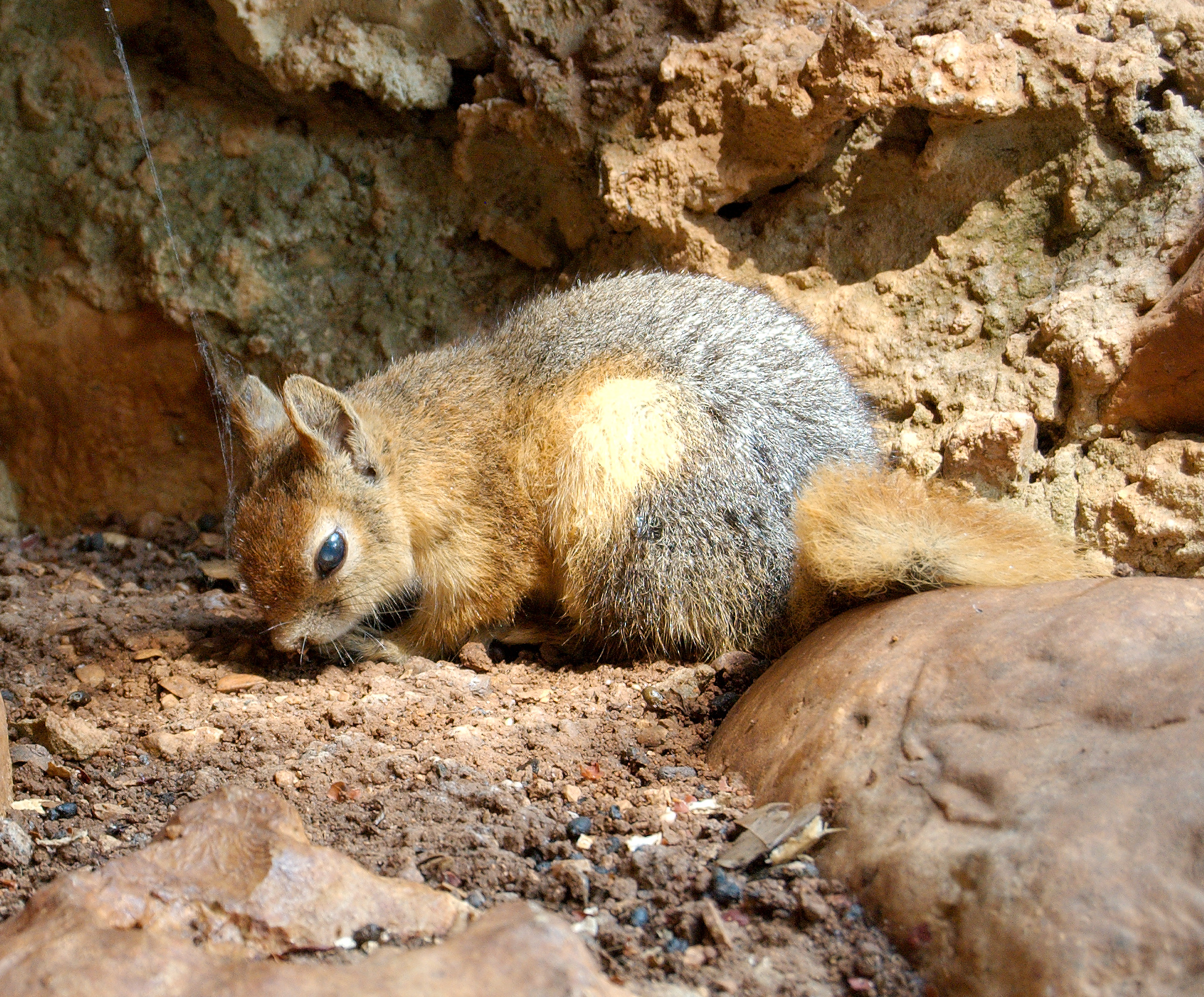
Persian squirrel

=== Birds ===
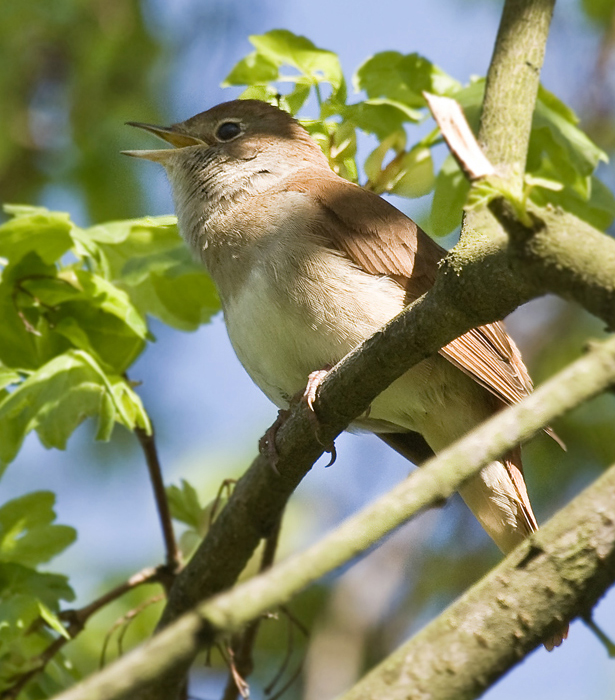
Common nightingale

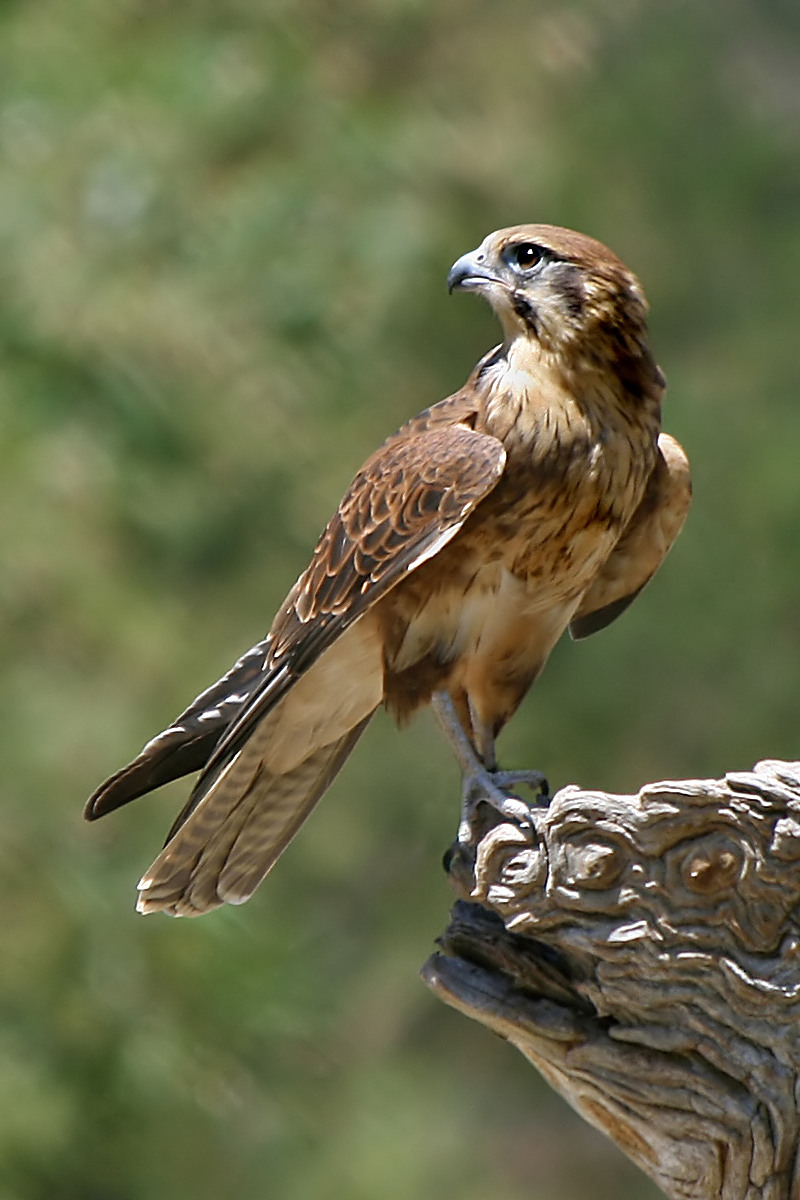
Common kestrel

=== National flowers ===
Several flowers and plants have been referred to as national flowers of Iran in various sources. These include the water lily (Nymphaea, known as niloufar abi in Persian), the Sarv-e naz (a type of cypress), certain species of rose, and the tulip (Tulipa).

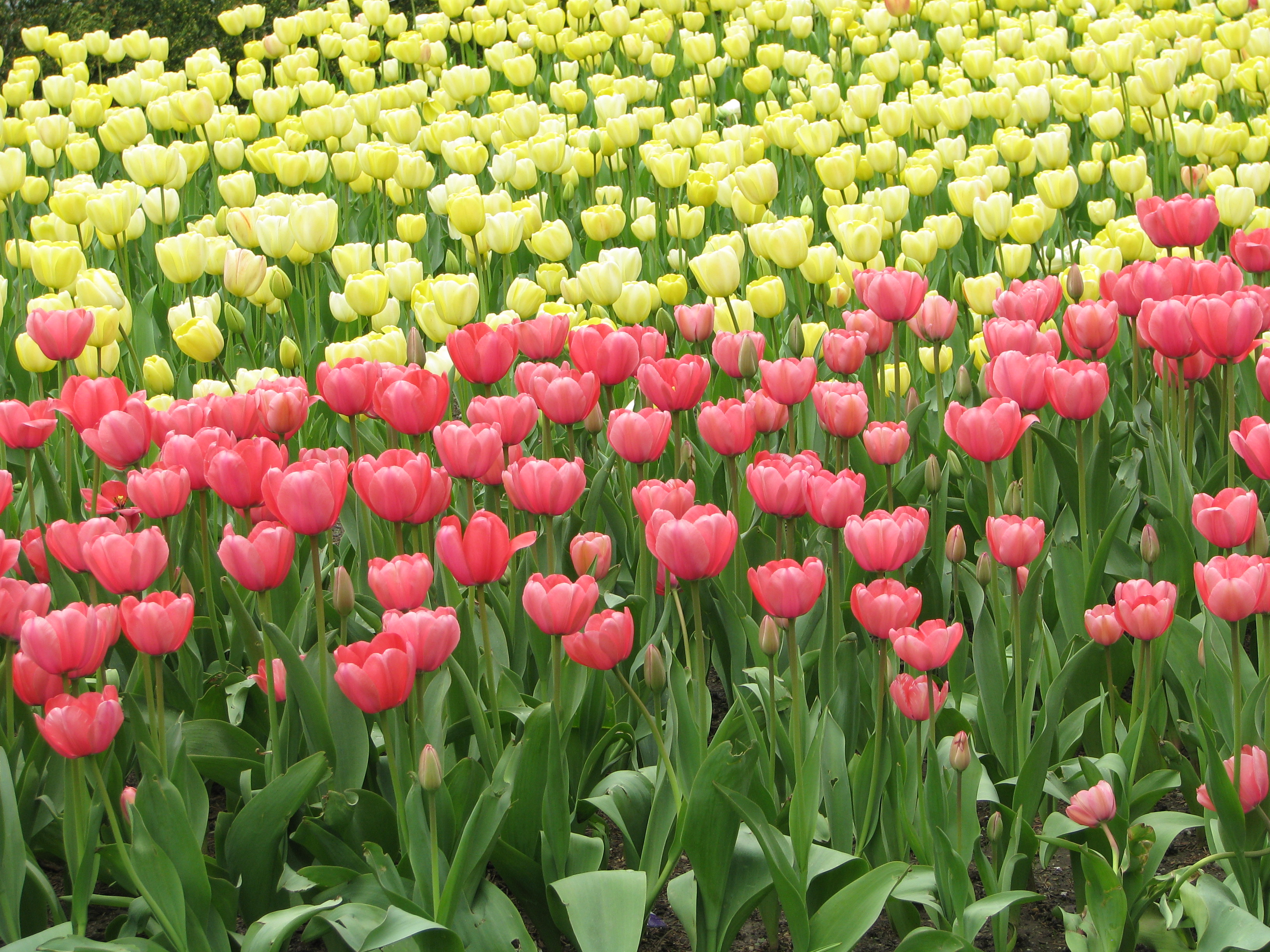
Tulip, one of the flowers symbolically associated with Iran

=== Water lily ===
The water lily or lotus held sacred status in ancient Iranian mythology as the flower of Anahita (Nahid), the primary feminine principle of existence in pre-Islamic Iranian religion, sharing similarities with ancient Indian beliefs. Its ancient and mythical significance among Iranians and Indians is evident in architectural motifs featuring lotuses with 8, 12, or even 1,000 petals in artifacts from both cultures. In ancient Iranian lore, the water lily was believed to preserve the seed or divine glory (farr) of Zoroaster, kept in water. Some interpretations suggest that in depictions of the birth of Mithra, what appears as a pine cone is actually a lotus bud from which Mithra emerges, linking the flower closely to Mithraism. Due to its profound historical and cultural backing, the water lily has inspired extensive imagery and poetic imagination in Persian literature.

تا نگردی چون بنفشه سوی پستی سرنگون کی چو نیلوفر شود چشم تو بر خورشید باز

— Saadi Shirazi

=== Tulip ===
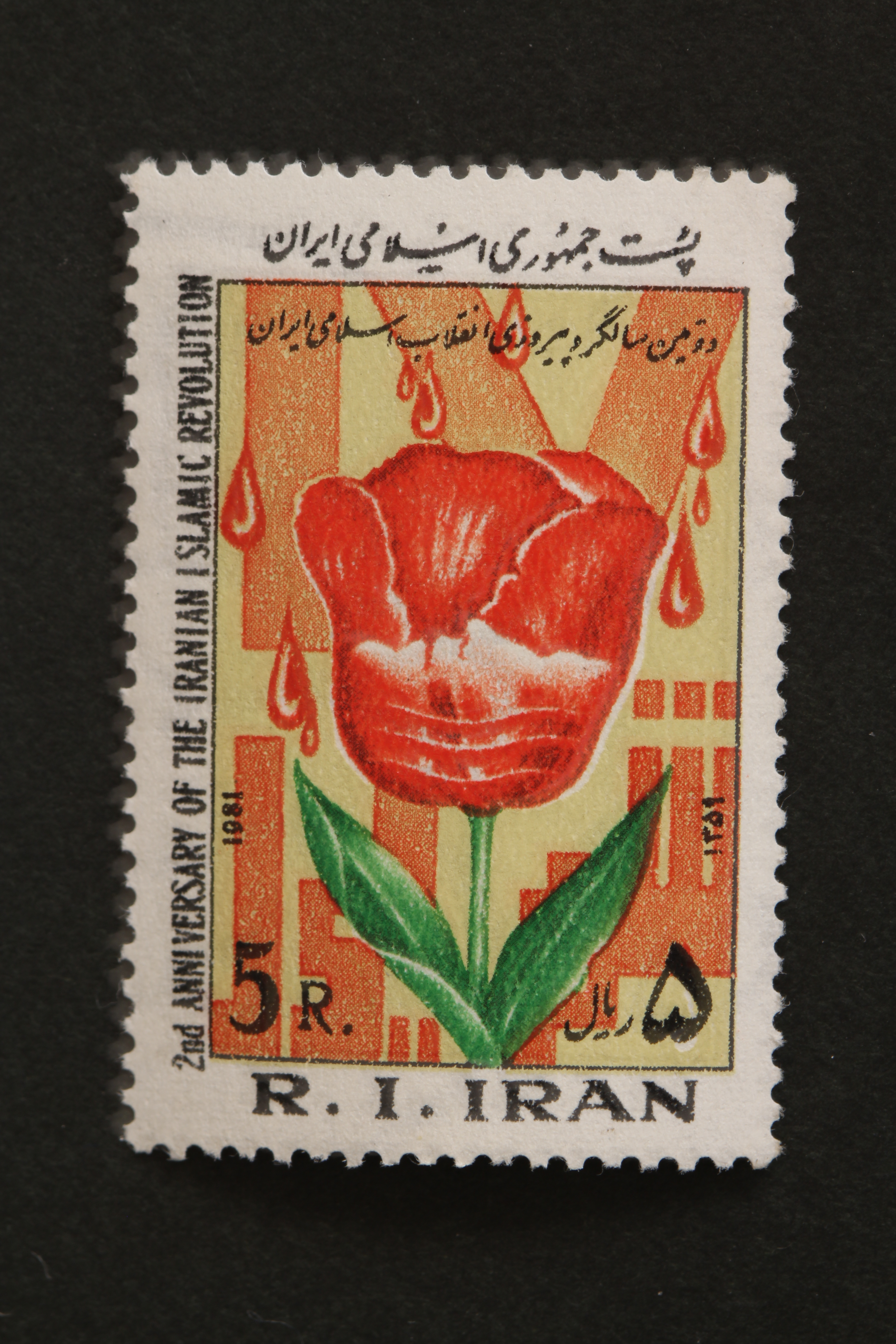
Tulip, symbol of martyrdom

In Iran, the tulip symbolizes martyrdom (shahid) and metaphorically refers to a person who has sacrificed their life for religious or national ideals. Shi'a traditions describe the plain of Karbala as having turned red with tulips from the blood of martyrs. A well-known Iranian revolutionary song likening martyrs to tulips is "To the blood-sleeping tulip, the martyr who washed his hands of life," composed by Mojtaba Mirzadeh.

=== Iranian rose ===
In a meeting held on 13 November 1995 attended by the president of the Iranian Horticultural Society and several university professors, the Iranian rose (Rosa damascena) was selected and confirmed as the national flower of the country.

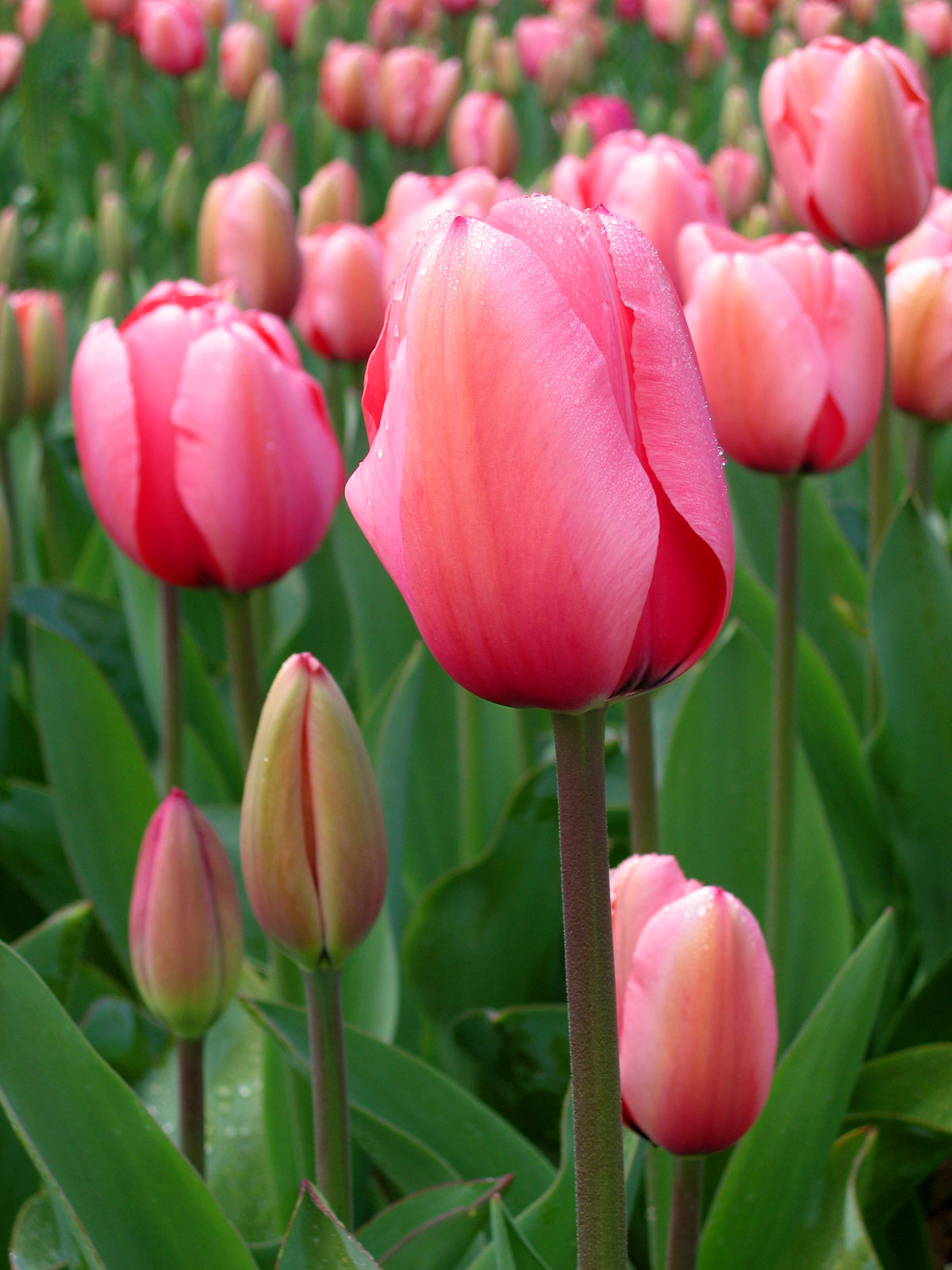
Tulip

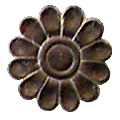
Water lily

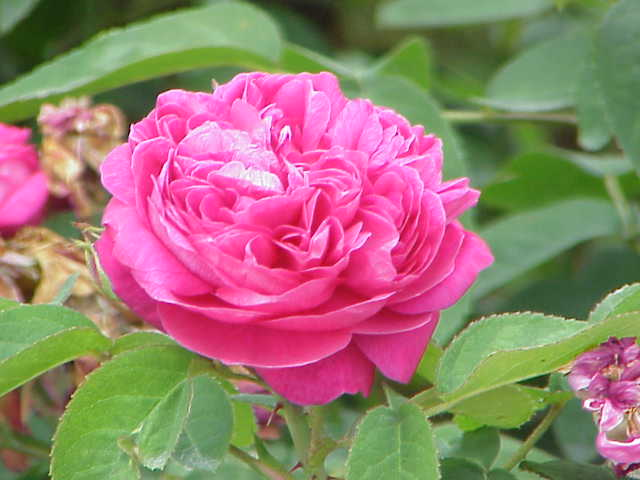
Damask rose (gol-e Mohammadi)

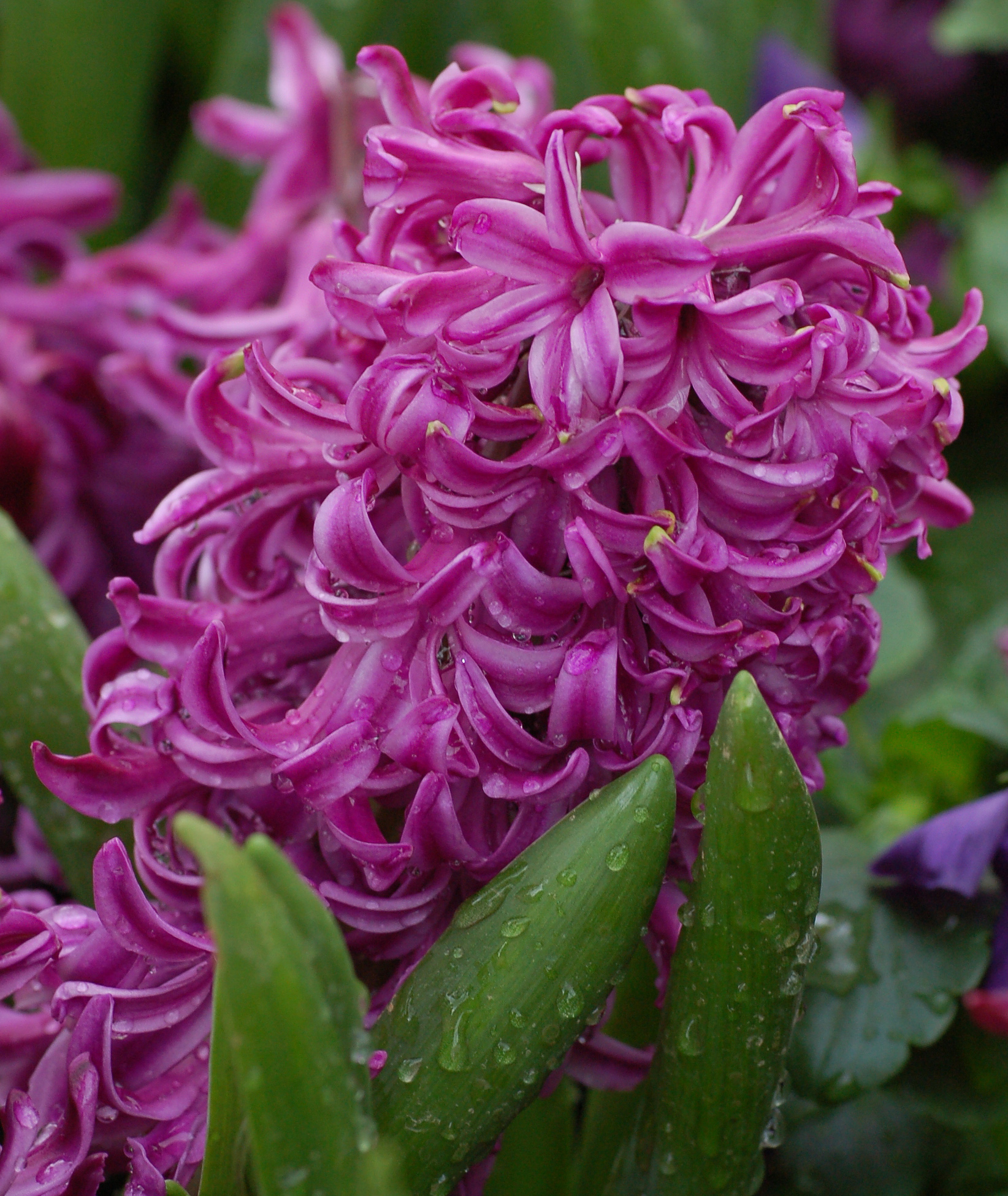
Hyacinth

=== Cypress of Abarkuh ===
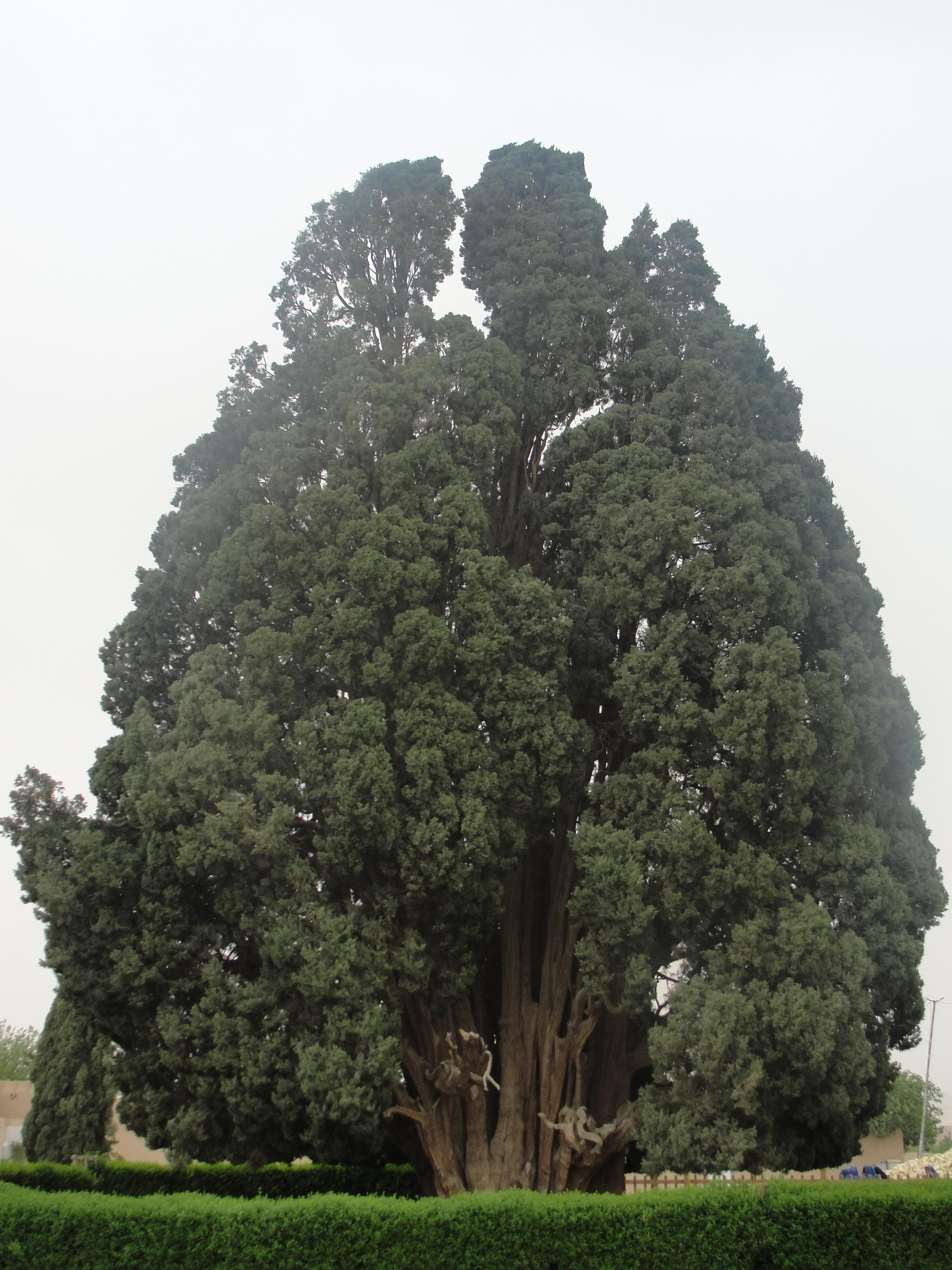
The Cypress of Abarkuh, estimated at approximately 5,500 years old, is regarded as the oldest tree in Iran and Asia, and the second-oldest in the world after the Methuselah pine in California.

The Cypress of Abarkuh (Persian: سرو ابرکوه, Sarv-e Abarkuh) (boteh jegheh) is one of the most important symbols in ancient Iran. It appears in reliefs and artifacts, such as those from the Achaemenid period at Persepolis. It is estimated to be over four millennia old and is likely the oldest living lifeform in Asia. According to legend, the tree was planted by Zoroaster, the founder of the Zoroastrian religion. It is said that Zoroaster left to spread his teachings to an Iranian city towards Balkh and met Shah Vishtaspa. He stopped at Abarkuh and supposedly planted this tree.

=== Sarv-e naz ===
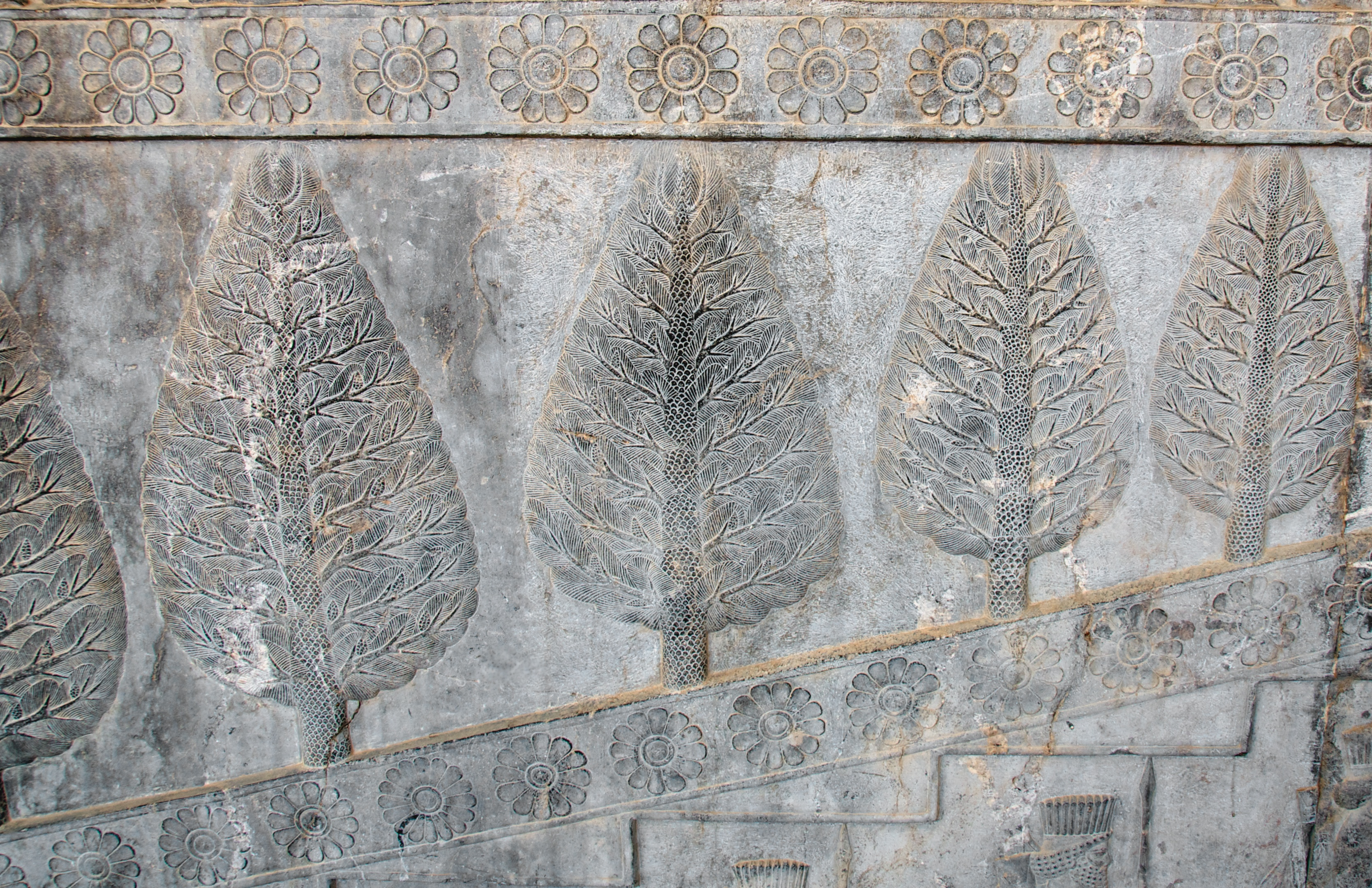
Stylized Cypress Trees from Persepolis, Shiraz, Iran. One of the three varieties of C. sempervirens native to Iran is called the Shirazi Cypress.

Cupressus sempervirens (Persian: سرو ابرکوه, Sarv-e nāz, Graceful Cypress), has a strong presence in culture, poetry and gardens. It bears several metaphors, including the "graceful figure and stately gait of [the] beloved". Iranians considered cypress to be a relic of Zoroaster. A Zoroastrian tradition recorded by Daqiqi maintains that King Vishtaspa, after converting to Zoroastrianism, ordered a cypress brought from paradise by Zoroaster to be planted near the first fire temple.

The motif seen on Termeh shawls and qalamkar prints from Isfahan depicts a cypress bent at the top by the wind, indicating ancient reverence for the tree. The cypress was sacred and a distinctive emblem of Iranians from early times. According to Iranian traditions, Zoroaster brought this tree (the Cypress of Kashmar) from paradise and planted it before a fire temple. Some link its association with freedom to connections with Anahita, who symbolizes liberty in myths. The Avesta refers to the cypress as a paradisiacal tree.

== Cuisine ==
=== Dishes ===
- Chelow kabab
- Zereshk polo
- Sabzi polo
- Ghormeh sabzi
- Gheimeh
- Abgoosht
- Fesenjan
- Kashk
- Sholezard
- Faludeh
- Bastani

=== Produce ===
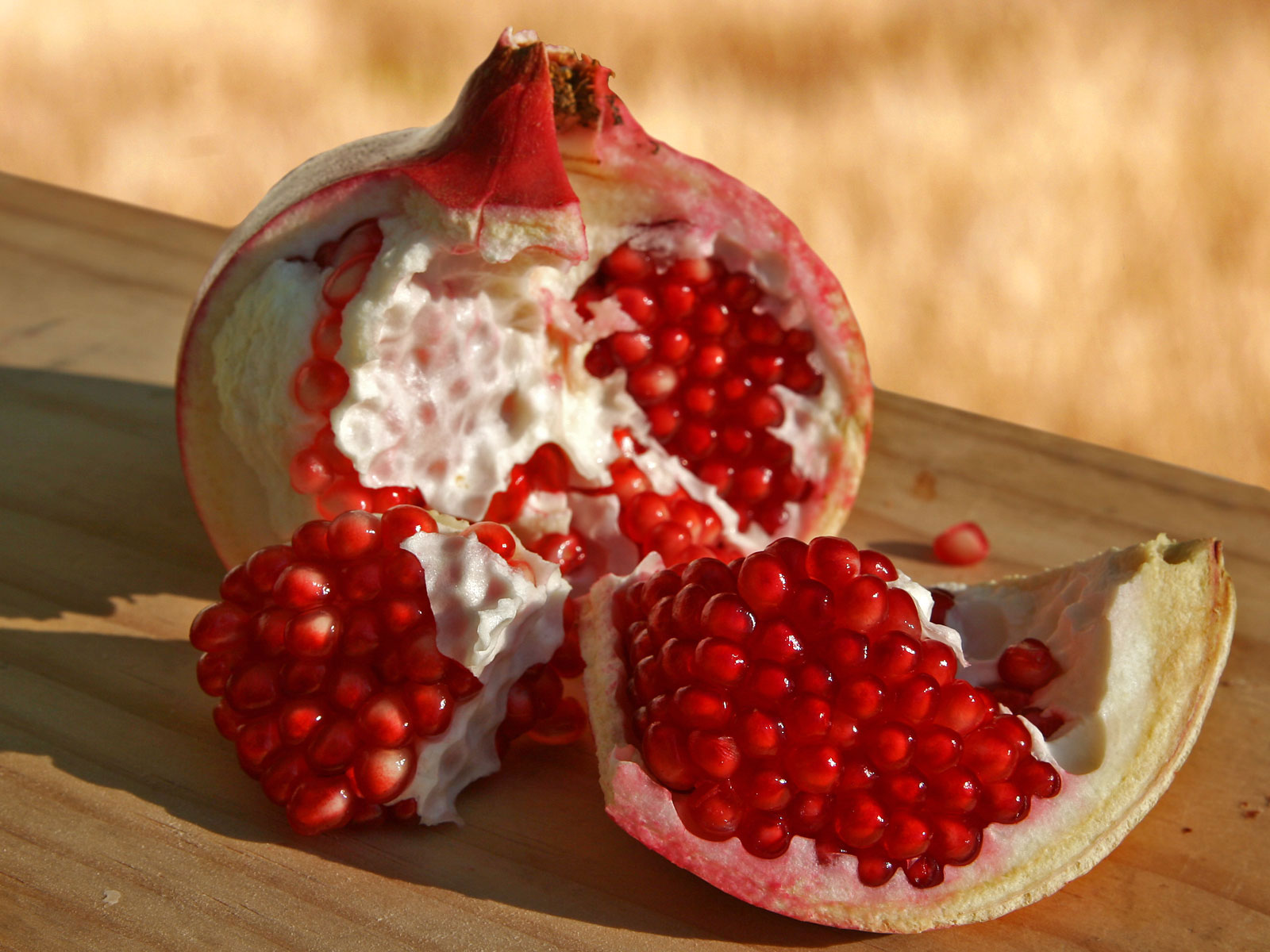
Pomegranate, the national fruit of Iran

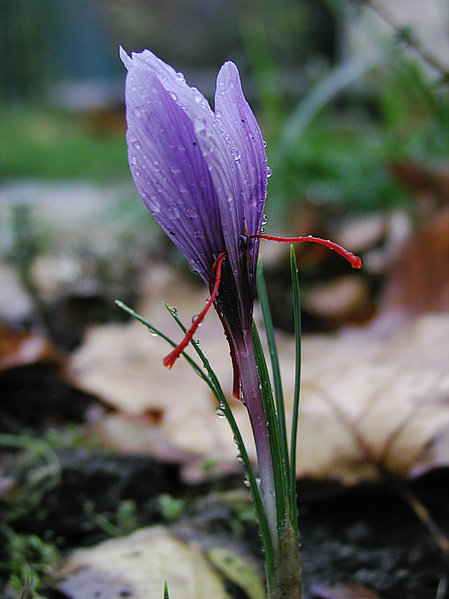
Saffron

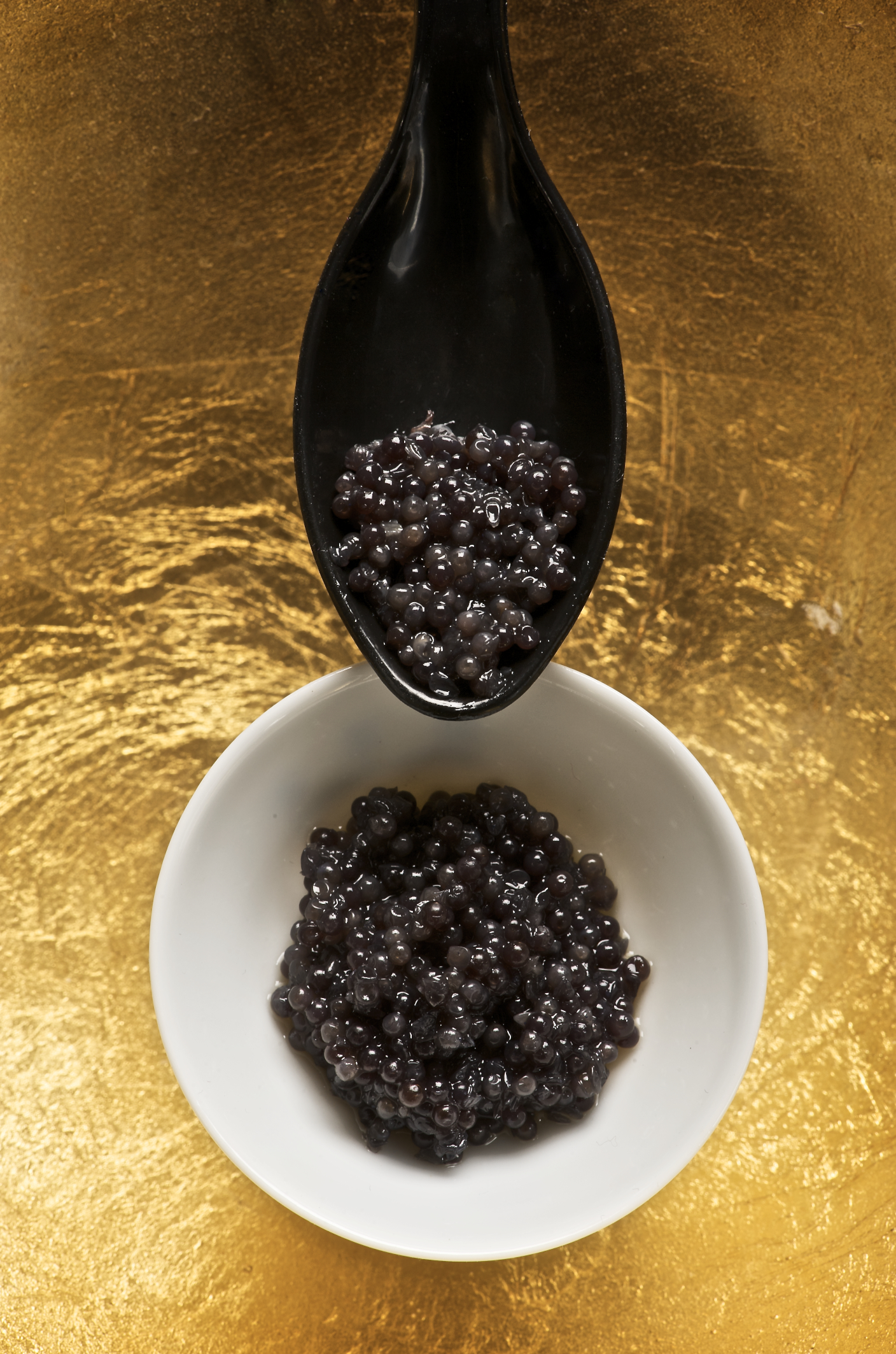
Caviar

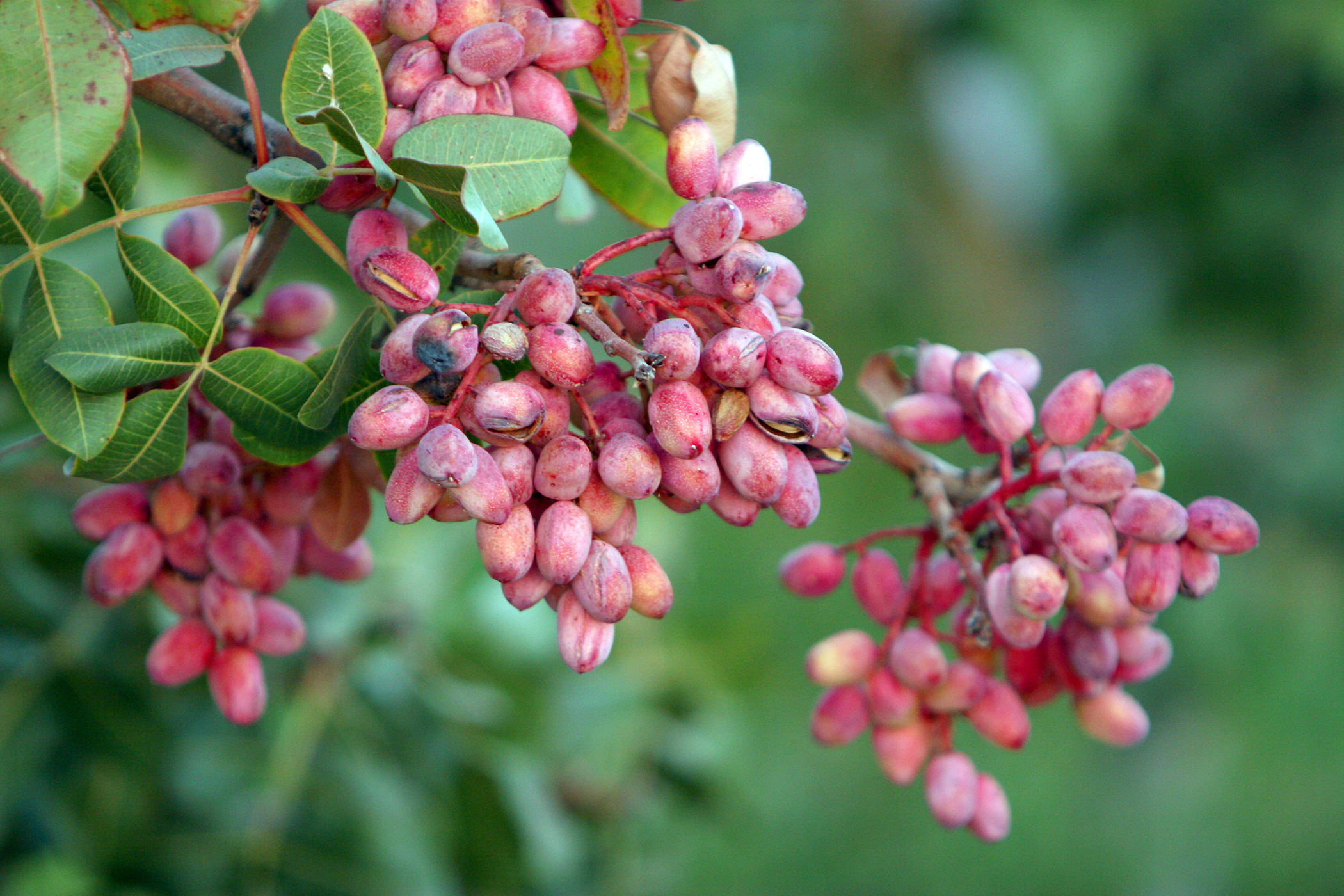
Pistachio

== Monuments and architecture ==
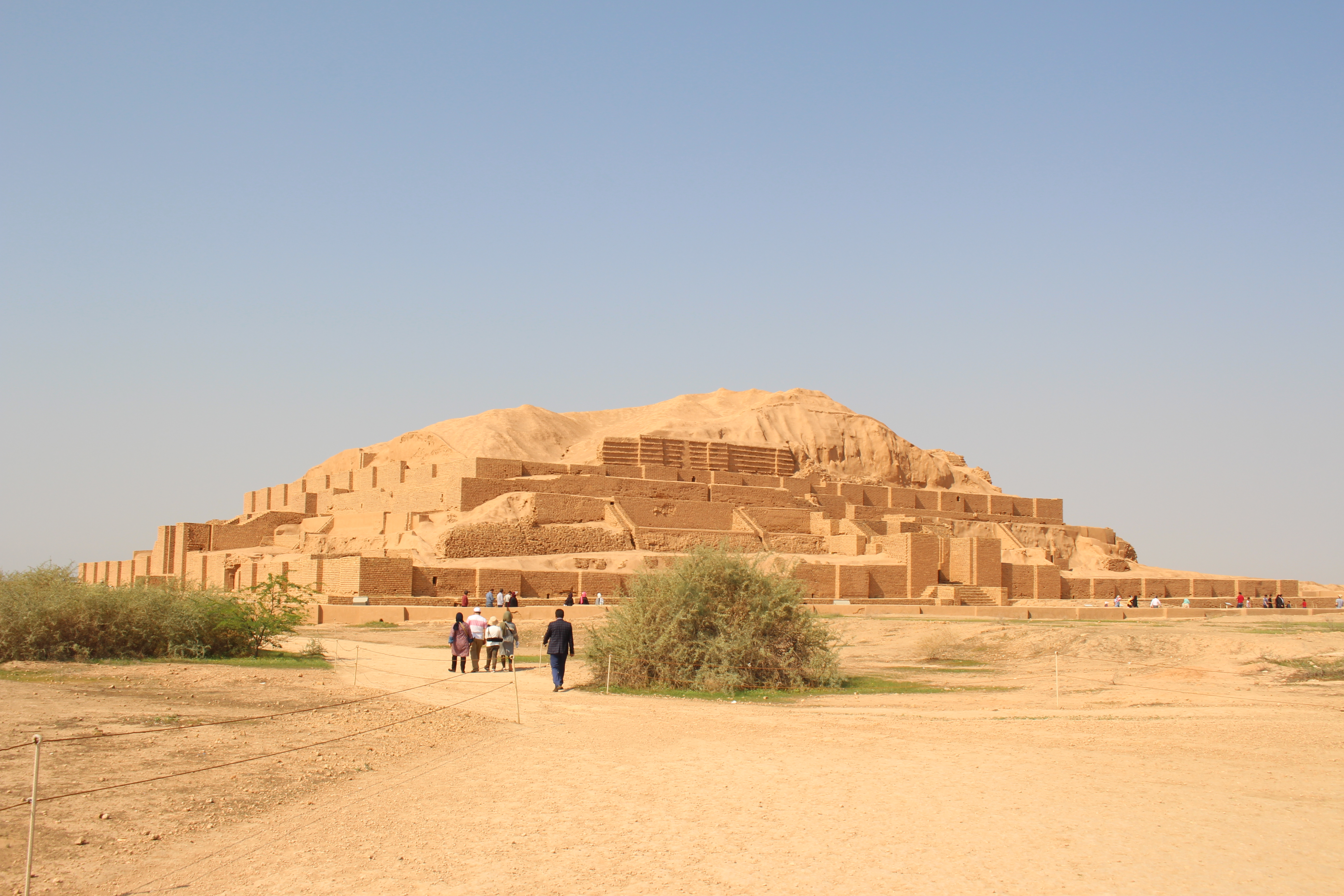
Chogha Zanbil

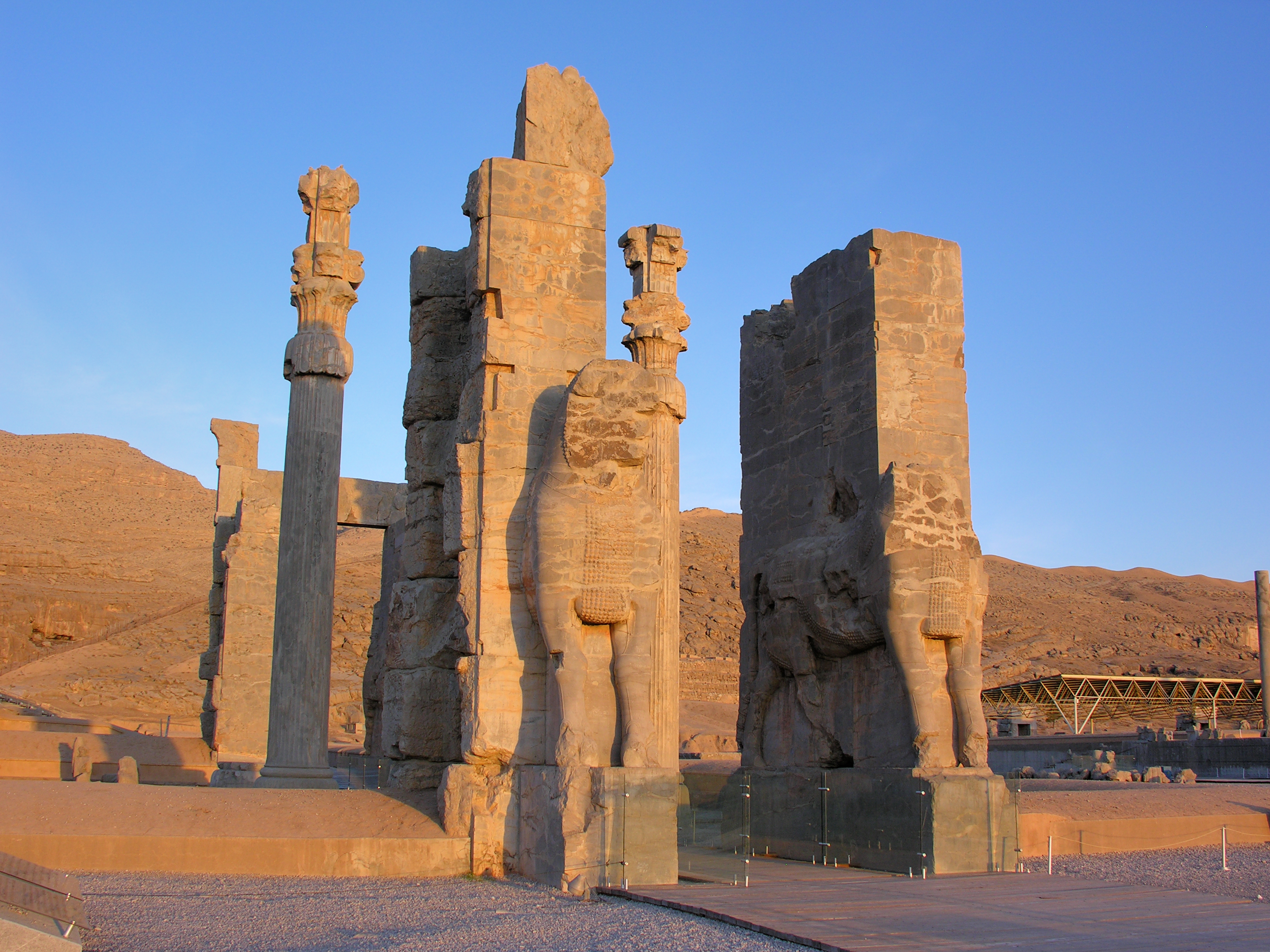
Persepolis

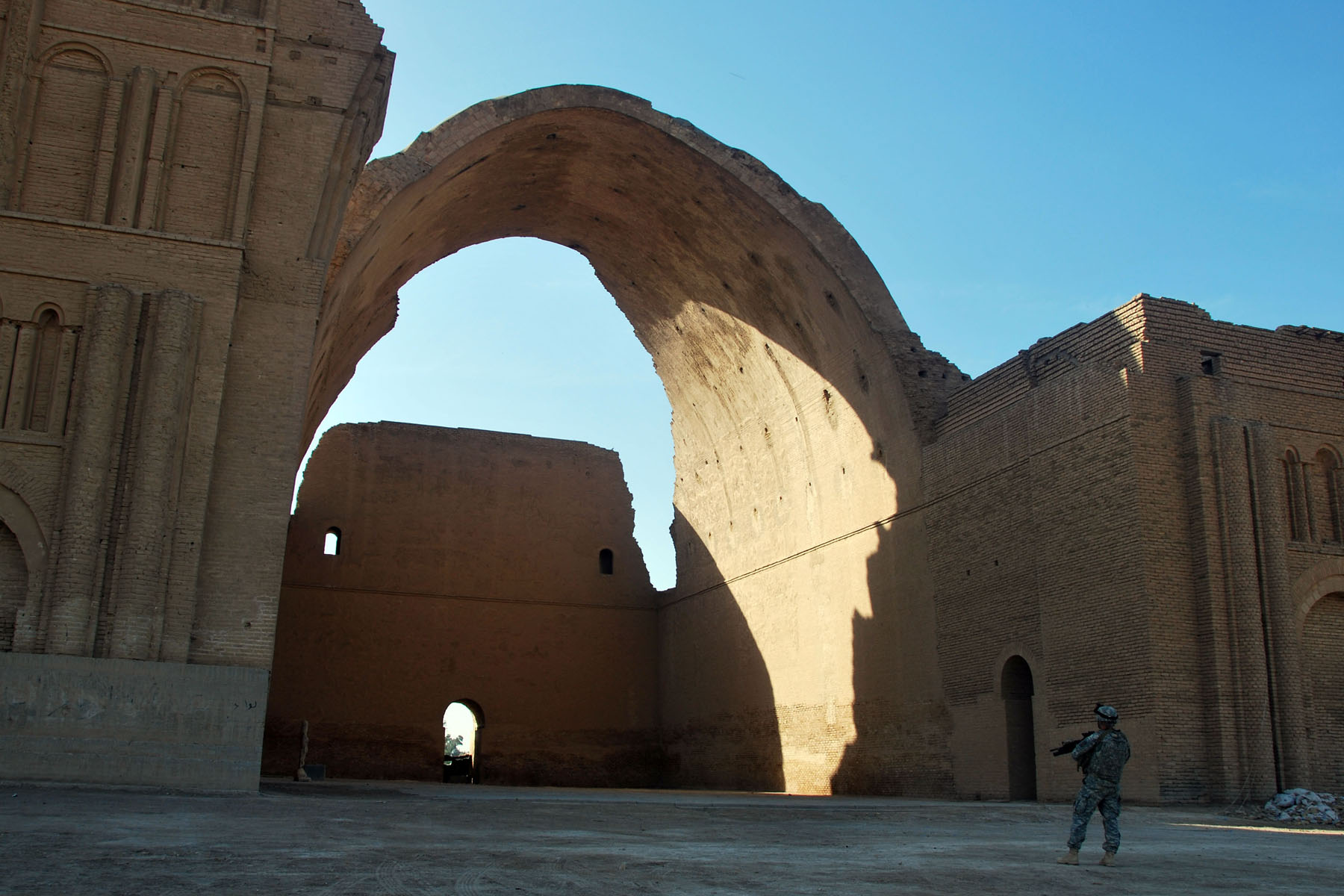
Taq Kasra (Arch of Khosrow)

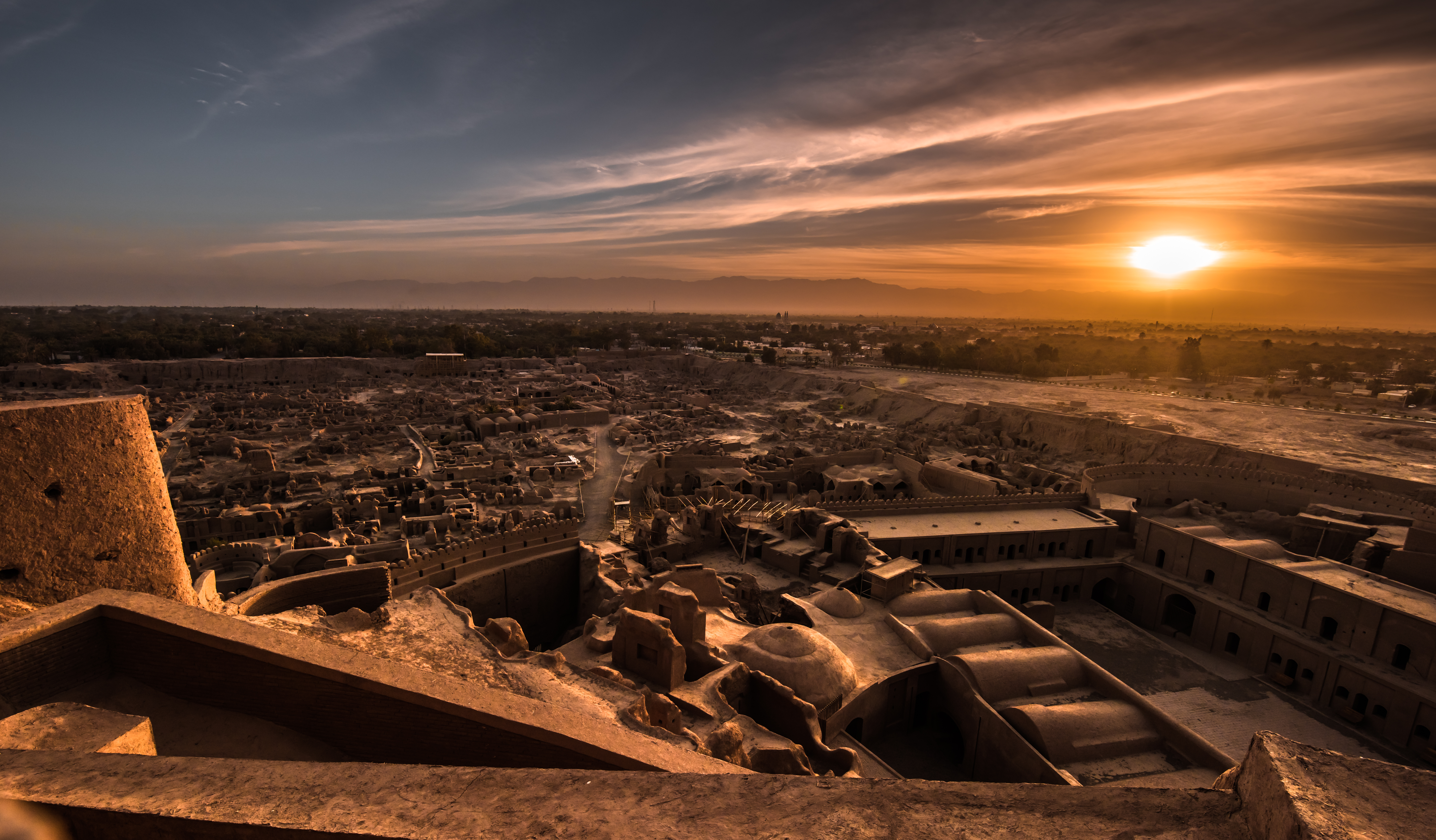
Bam Citadel

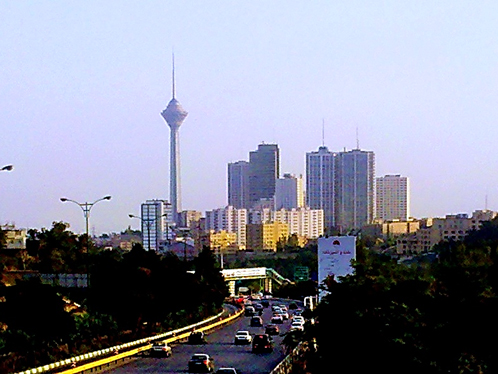
Milad Tower

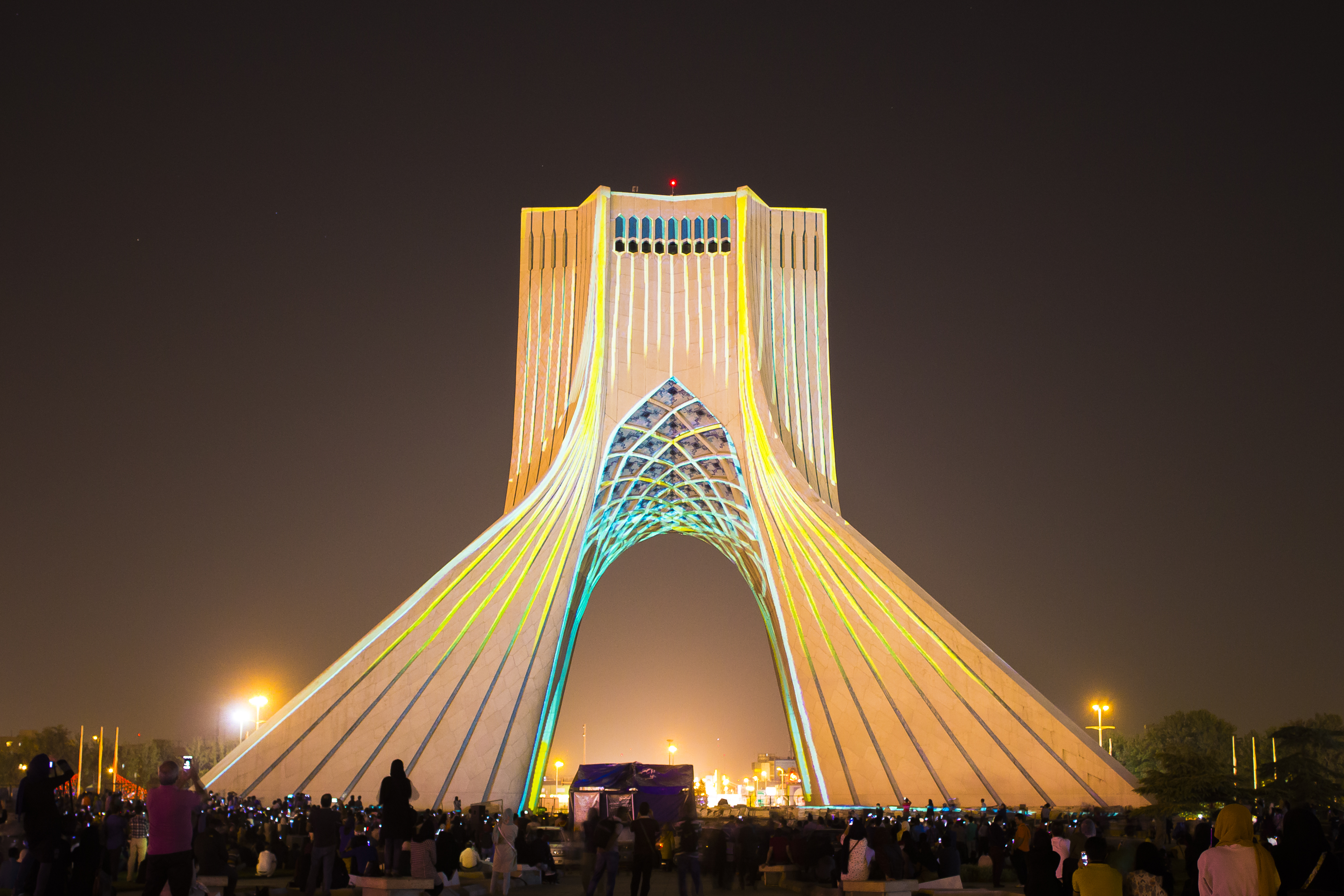
Azadi Tower

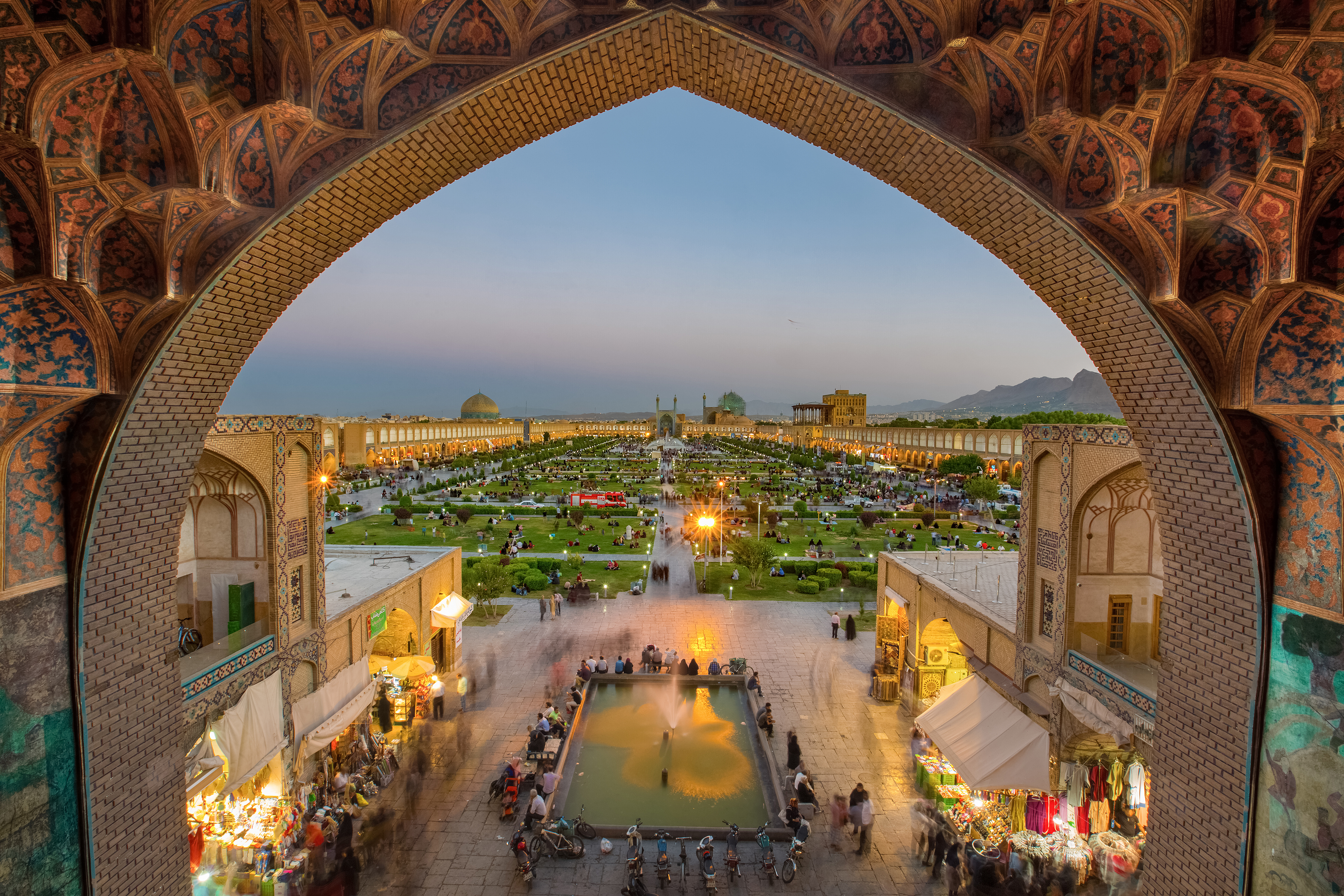
Naqsh-e Jahan Square

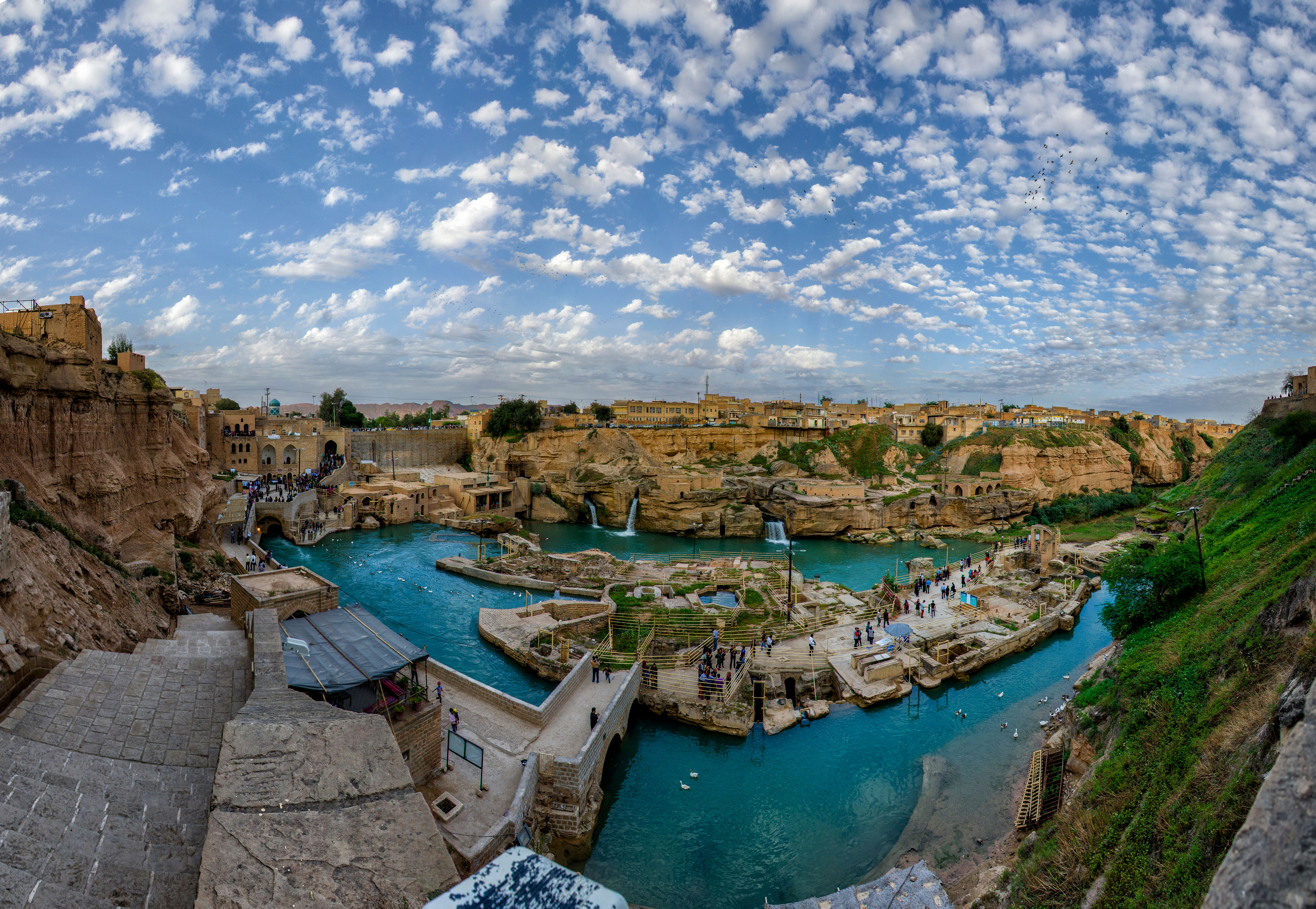
Shushtar Historical Hydraulic System

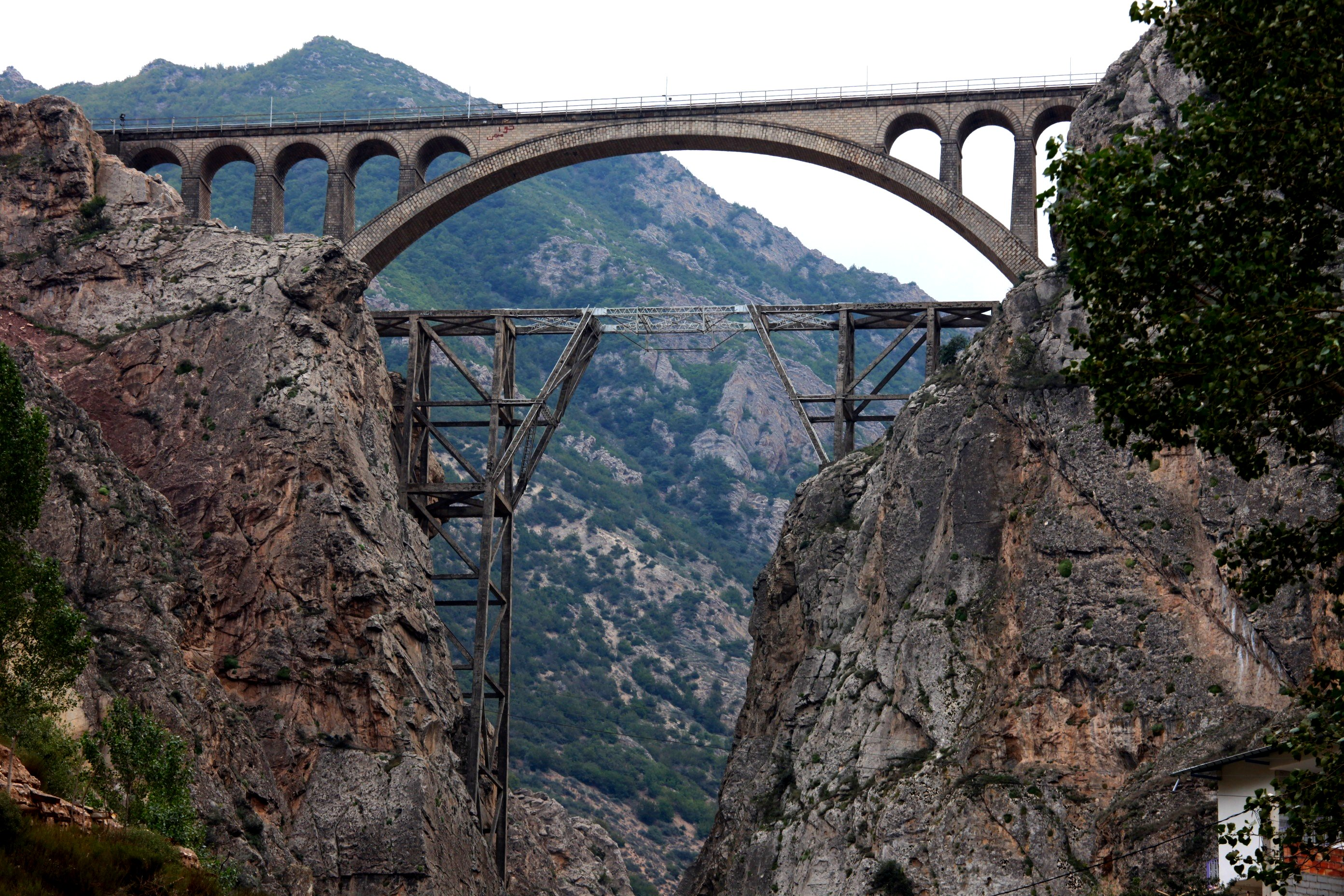
Veresk Bridge

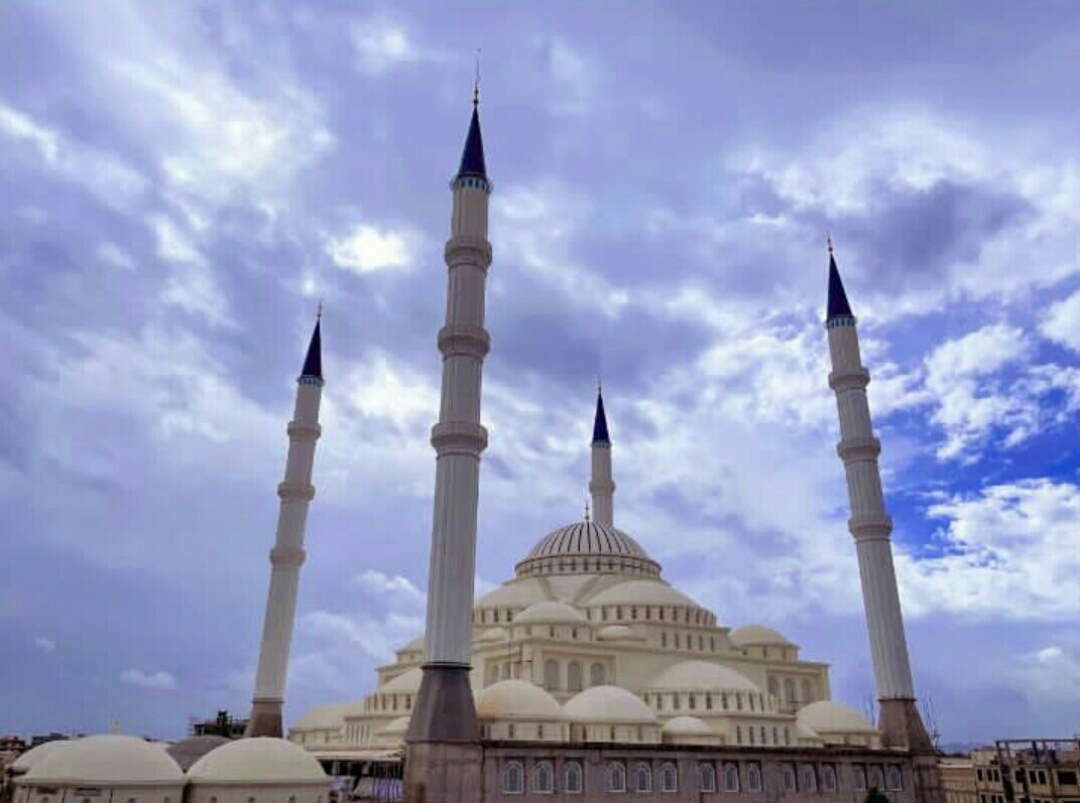
Grand Makki Mosque (Zahedan)

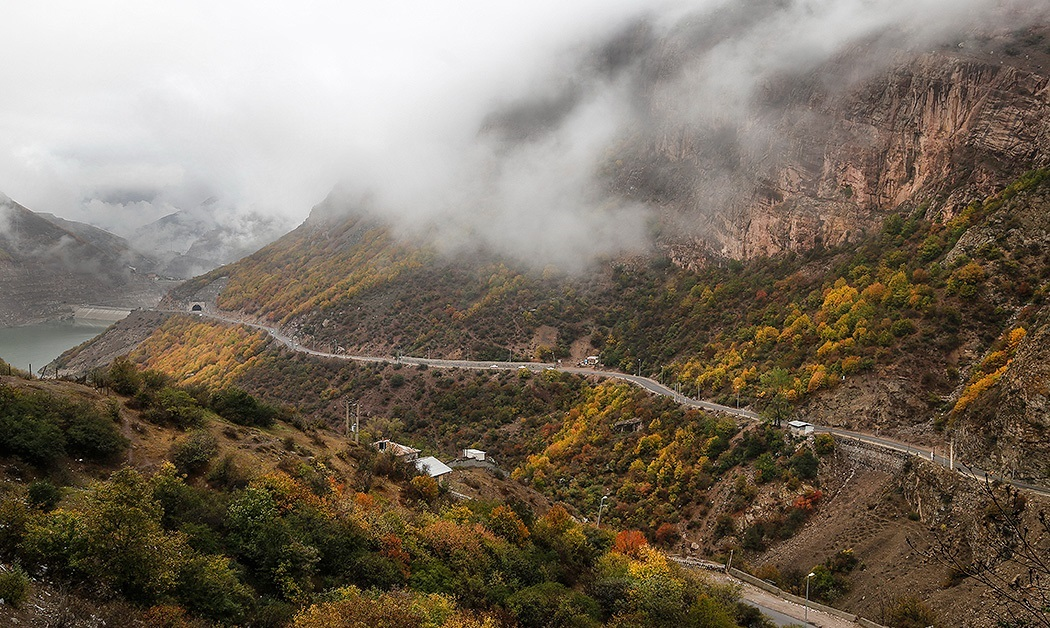
Chalus Road

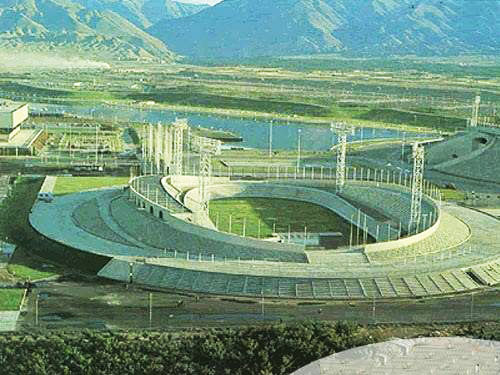
Azadi Stadium (Tehran)

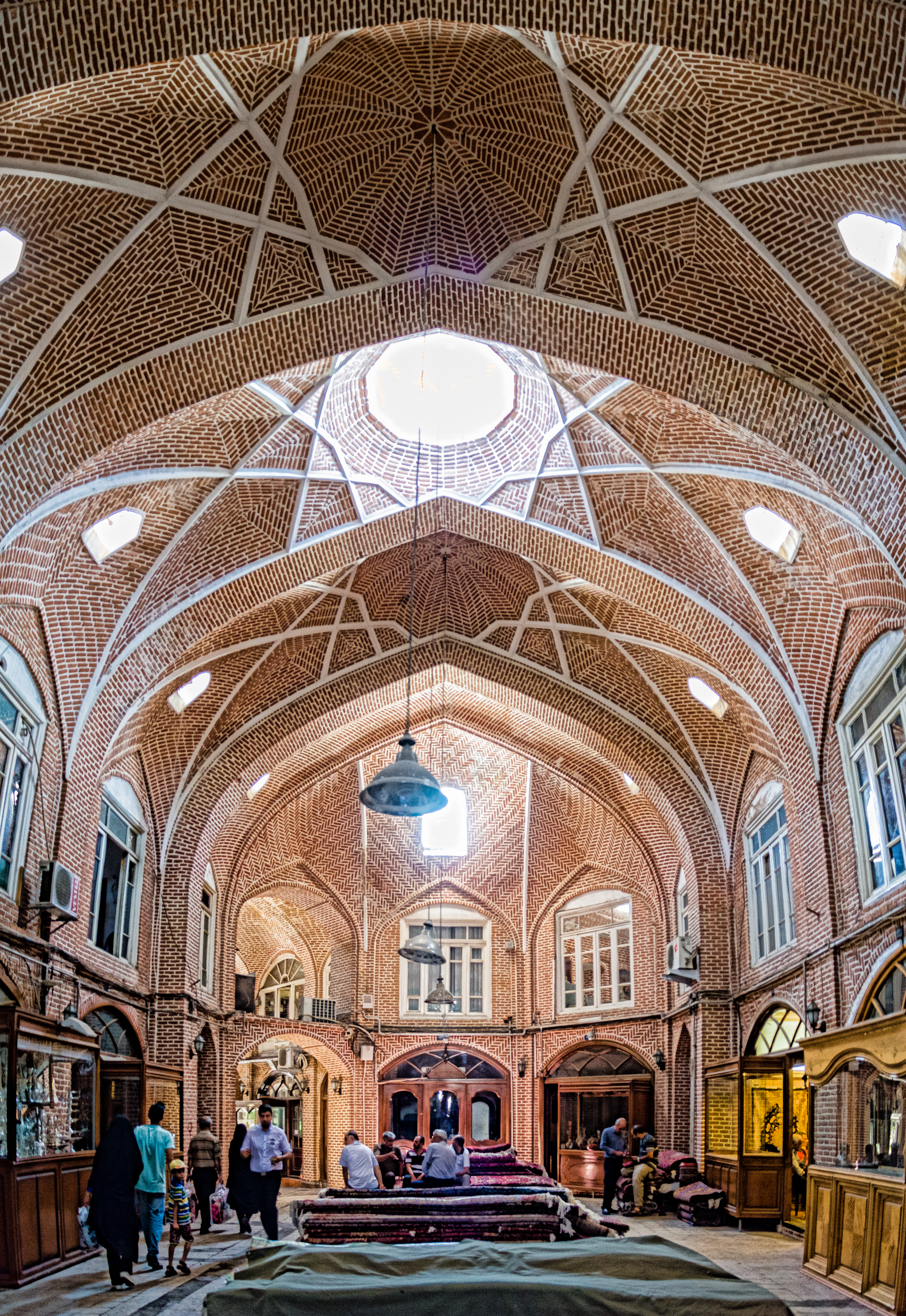
Tabriz Historic Bazaar Complex

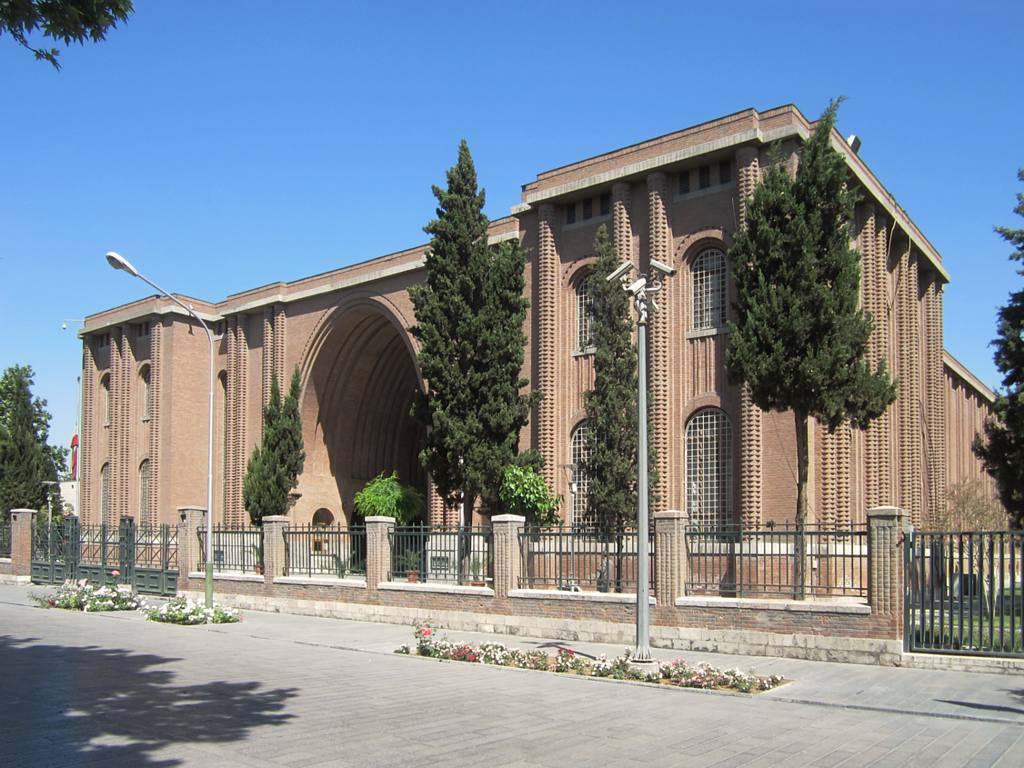
National Museum of Iran

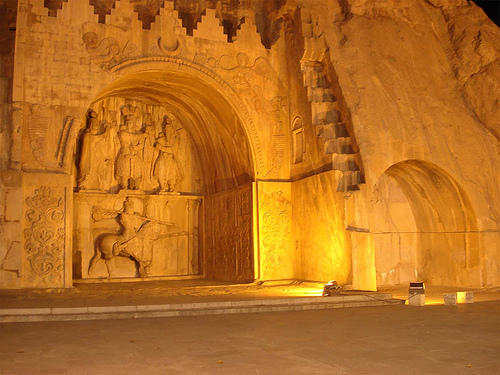
Taq-e Bostan

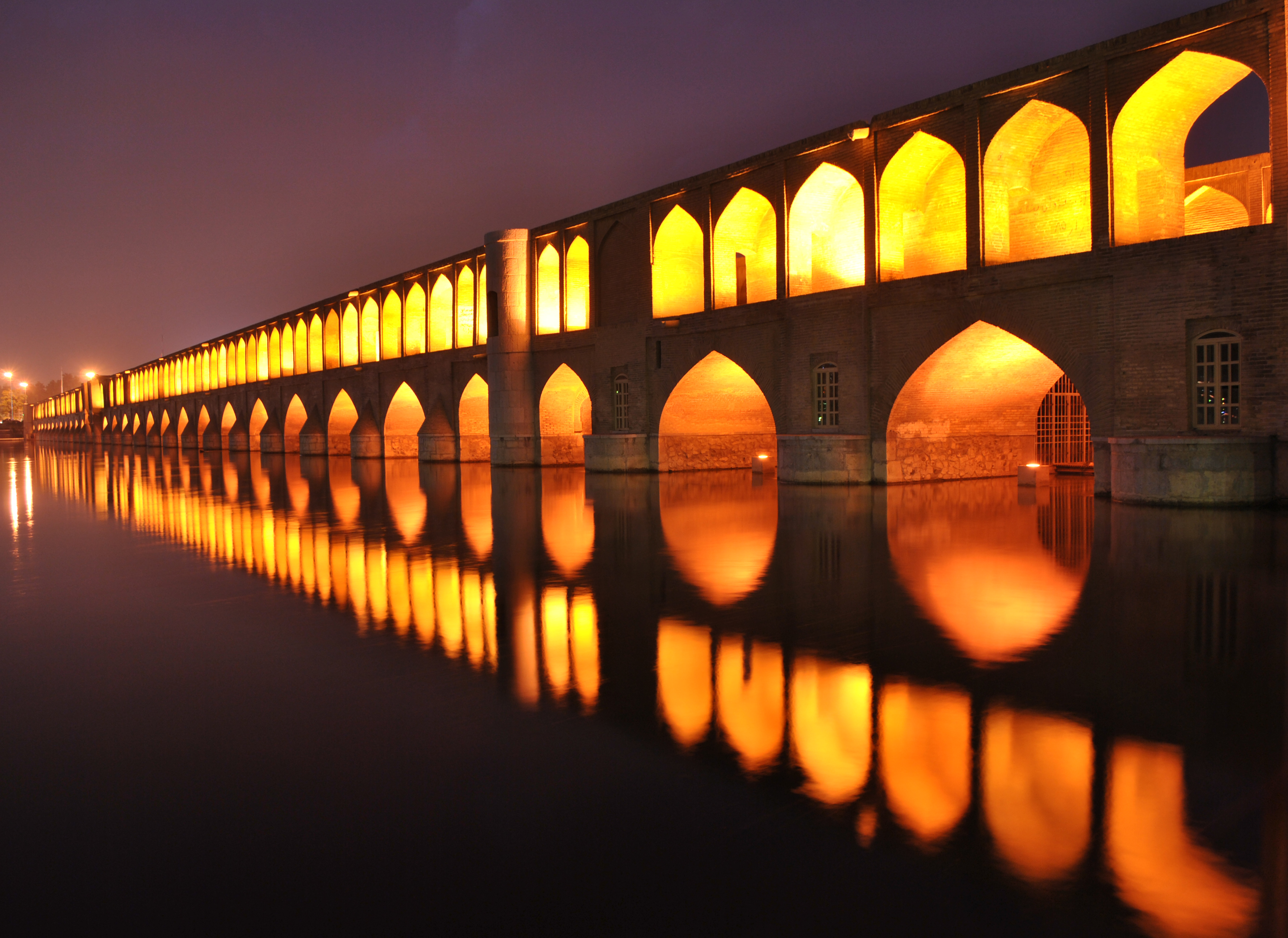
Si-o-se-pol

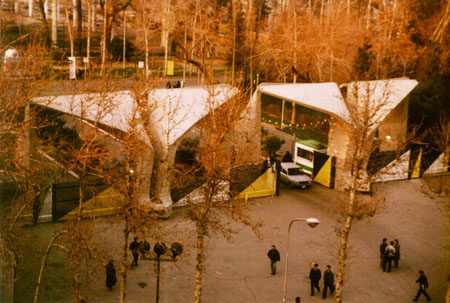
Main gate, University of Tehran

=== Mausoleums ===
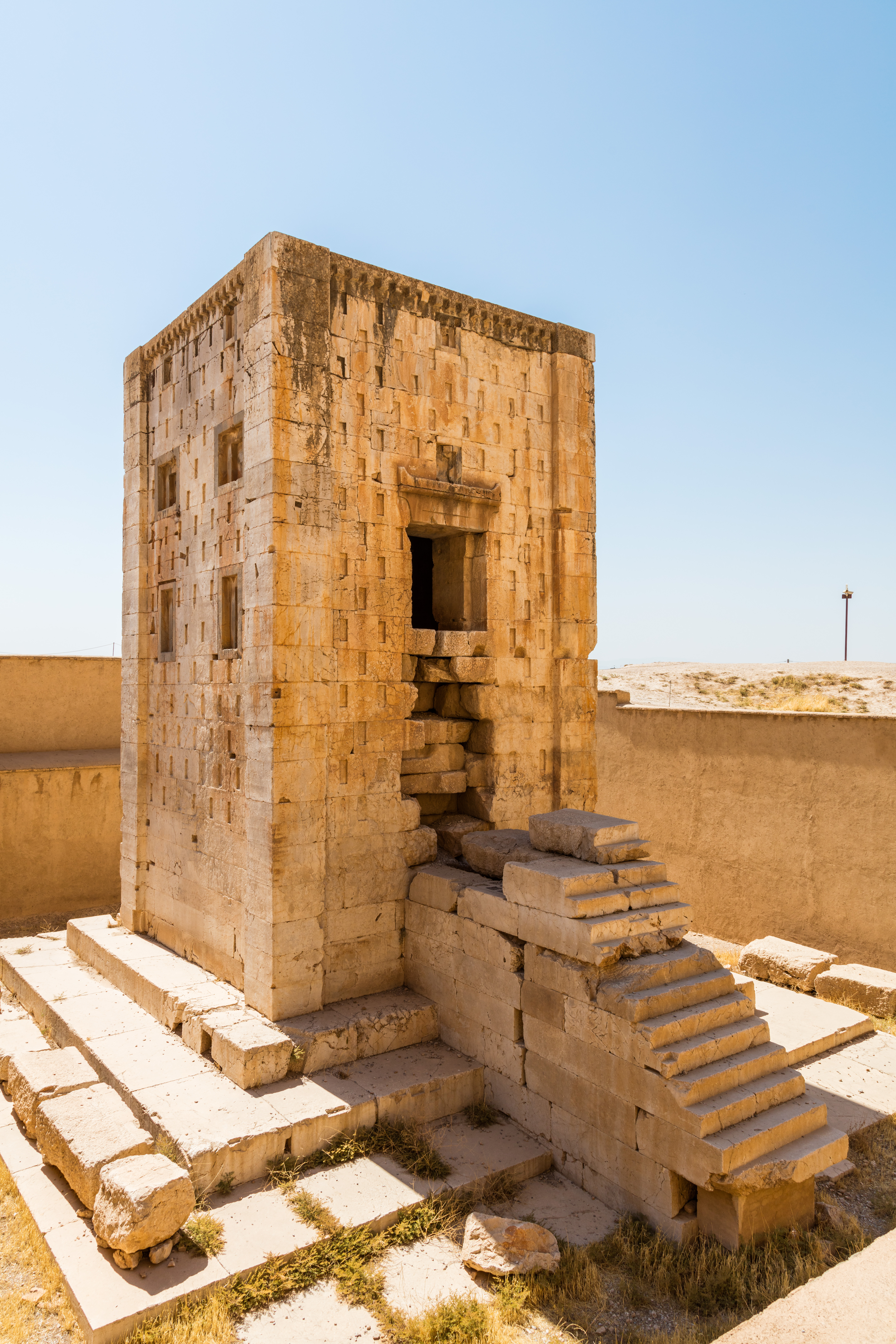
Naqsh-e Rostam

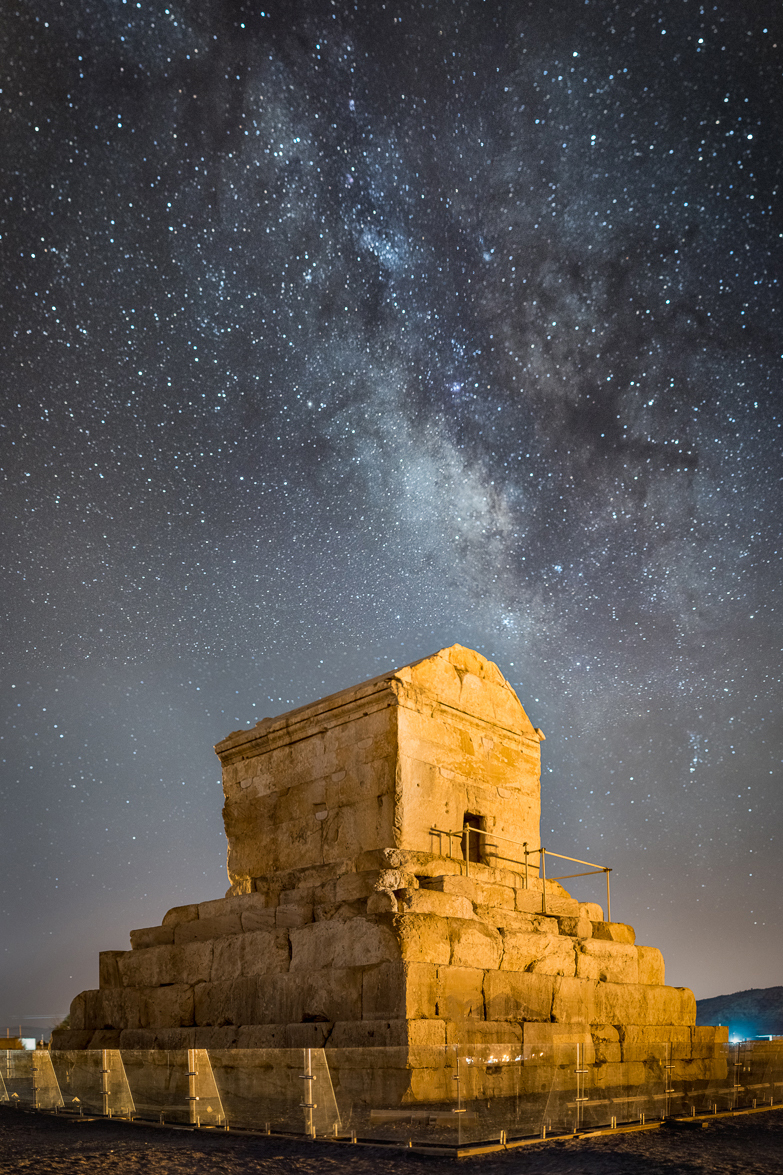
Tomb of Cyrus

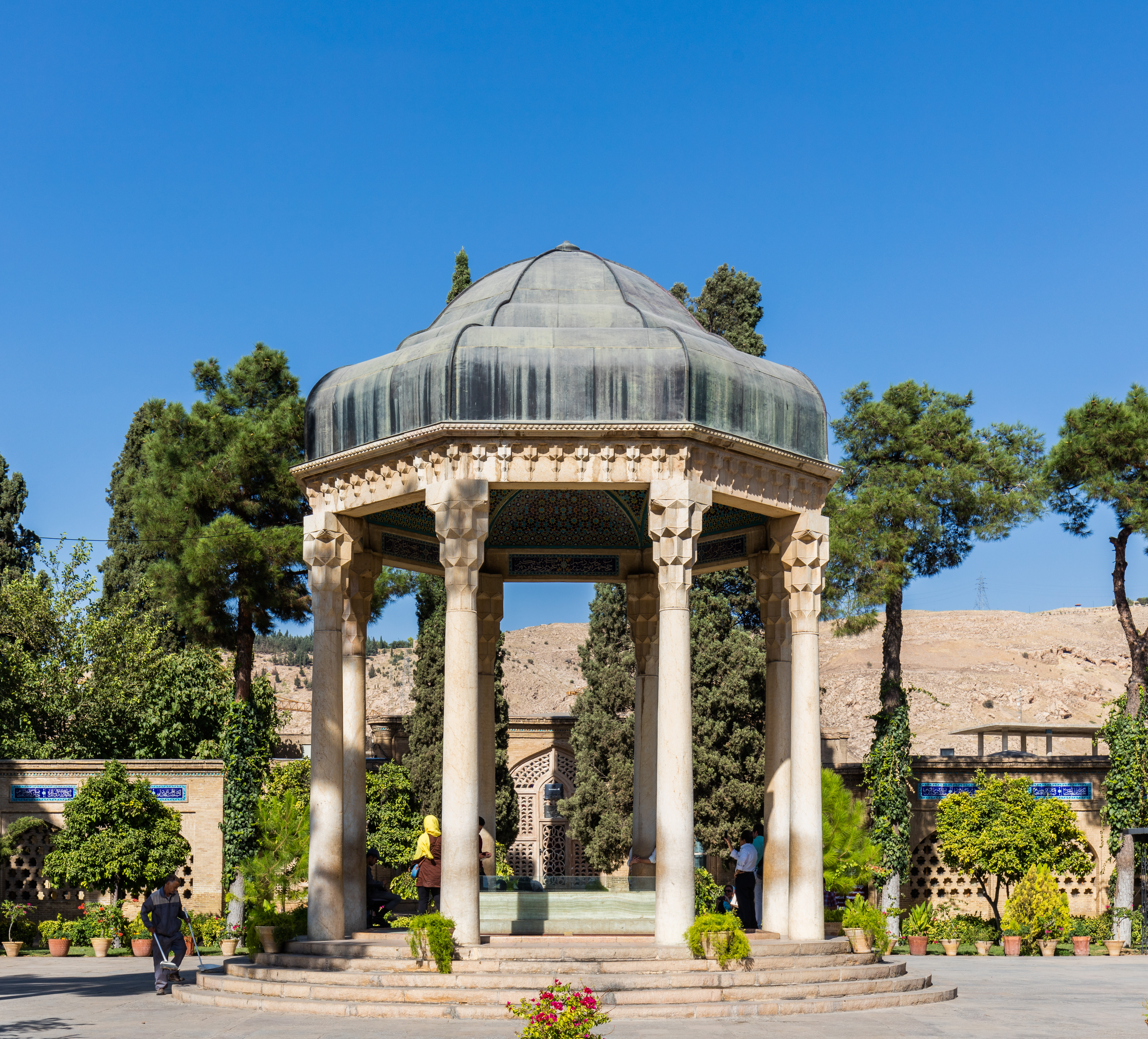
Tomb of Hafez

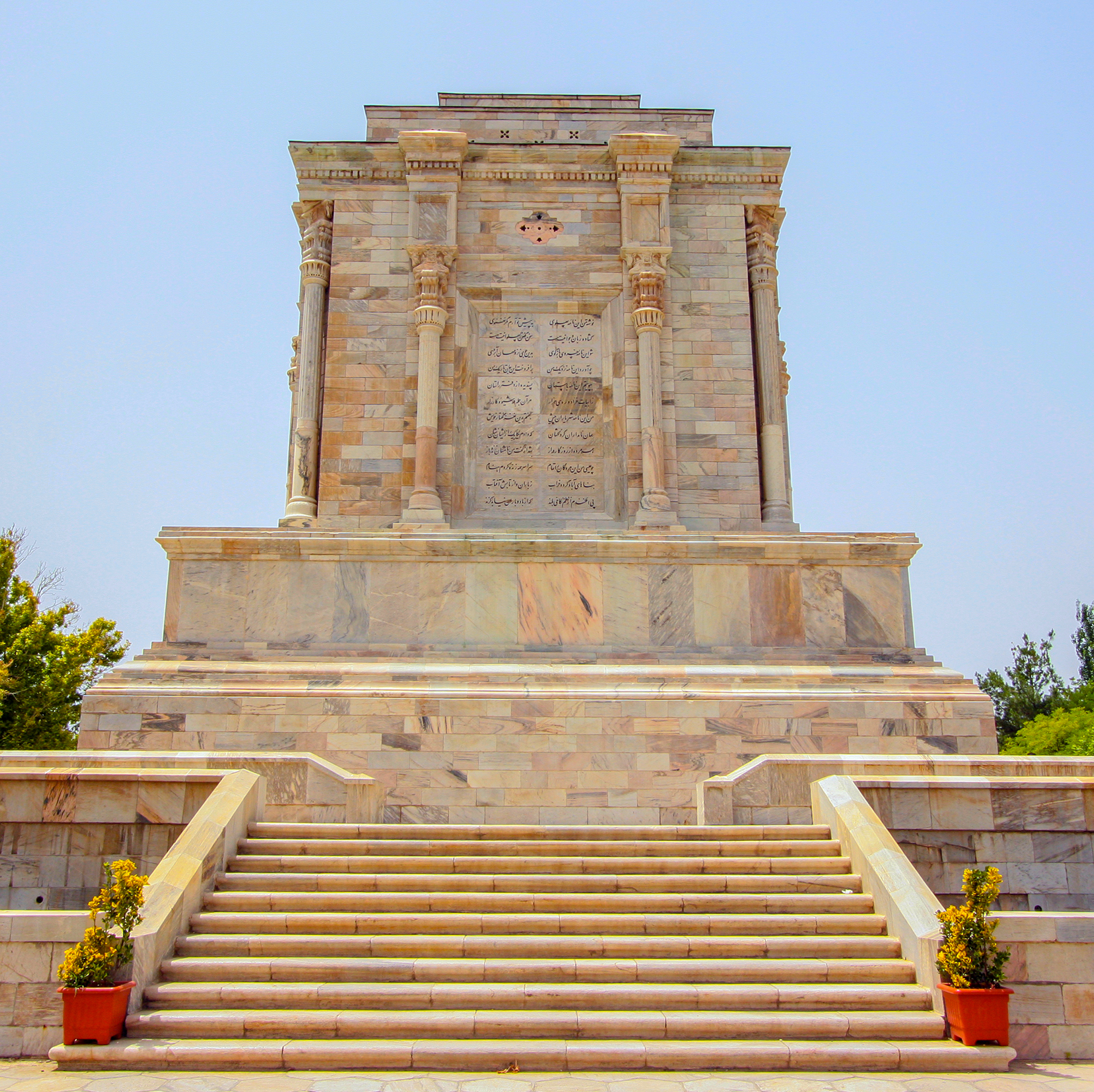
Tomb of Ferdowsi

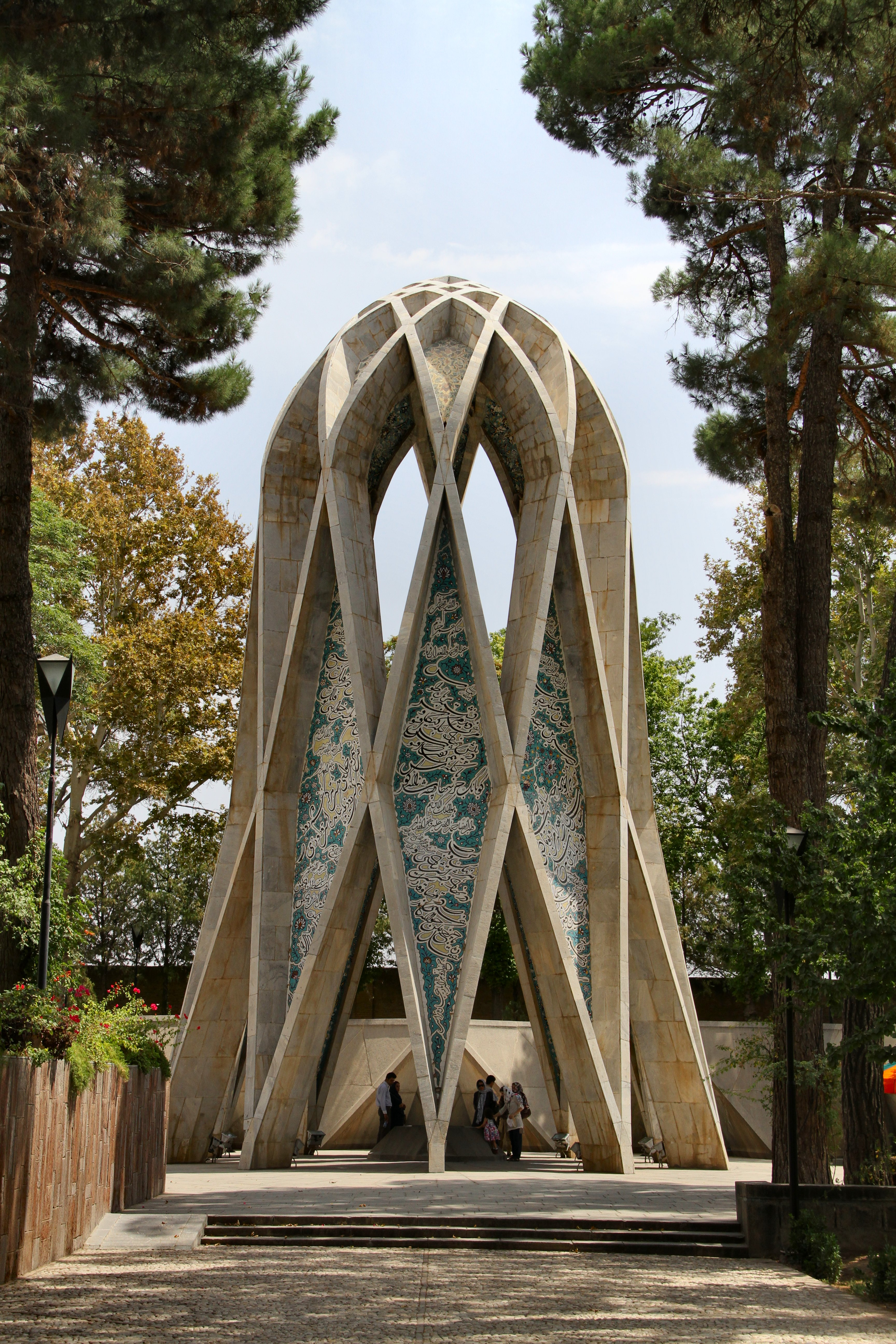
Tomb of Omar Khayyam

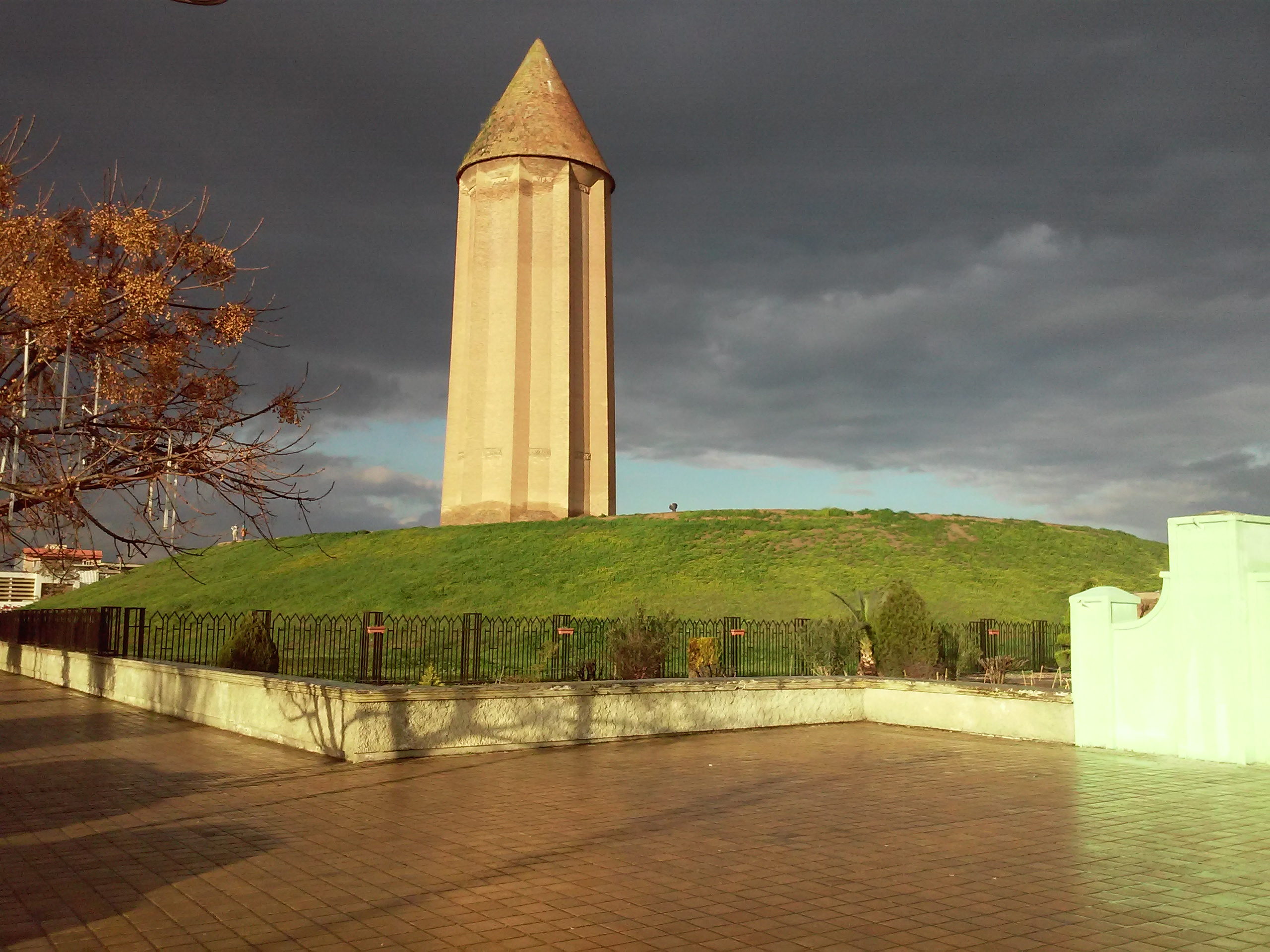
Gonbad-e Kavus (mausoleum of Qabus ibn Wushmagir)

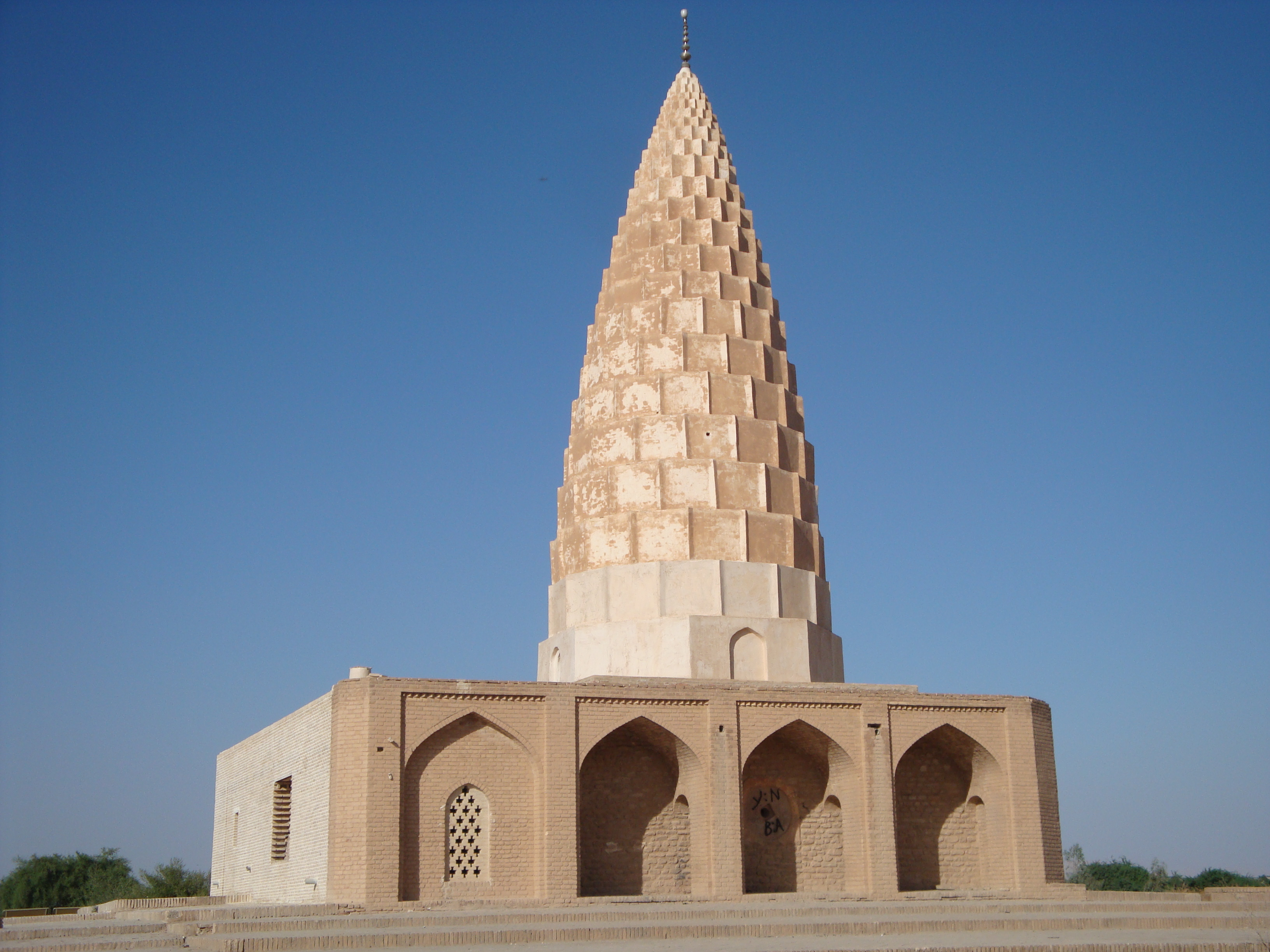
Tomb of Ya'qub ibn al-Layth al-Saffar

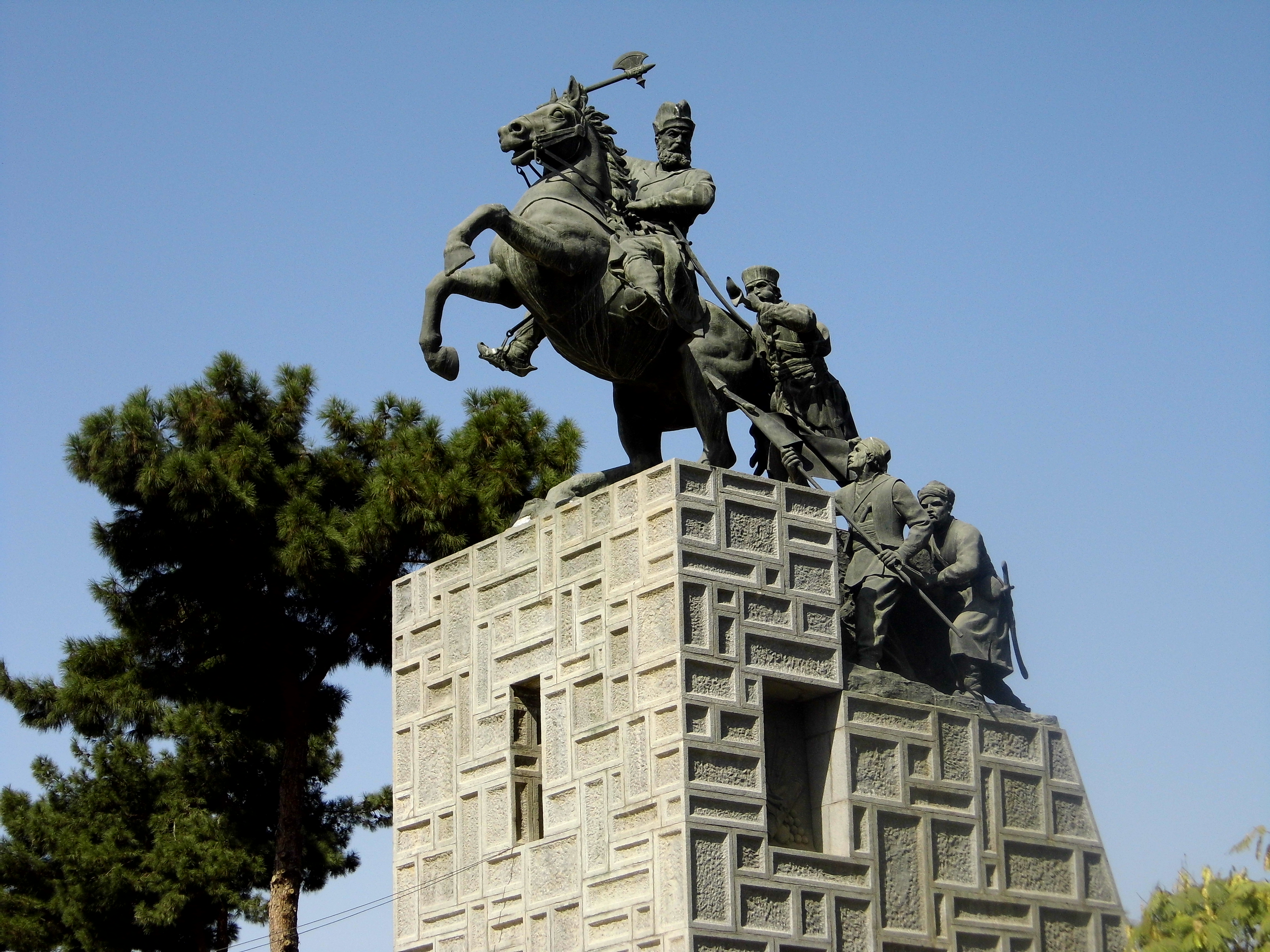
Tomb of Nader Shah

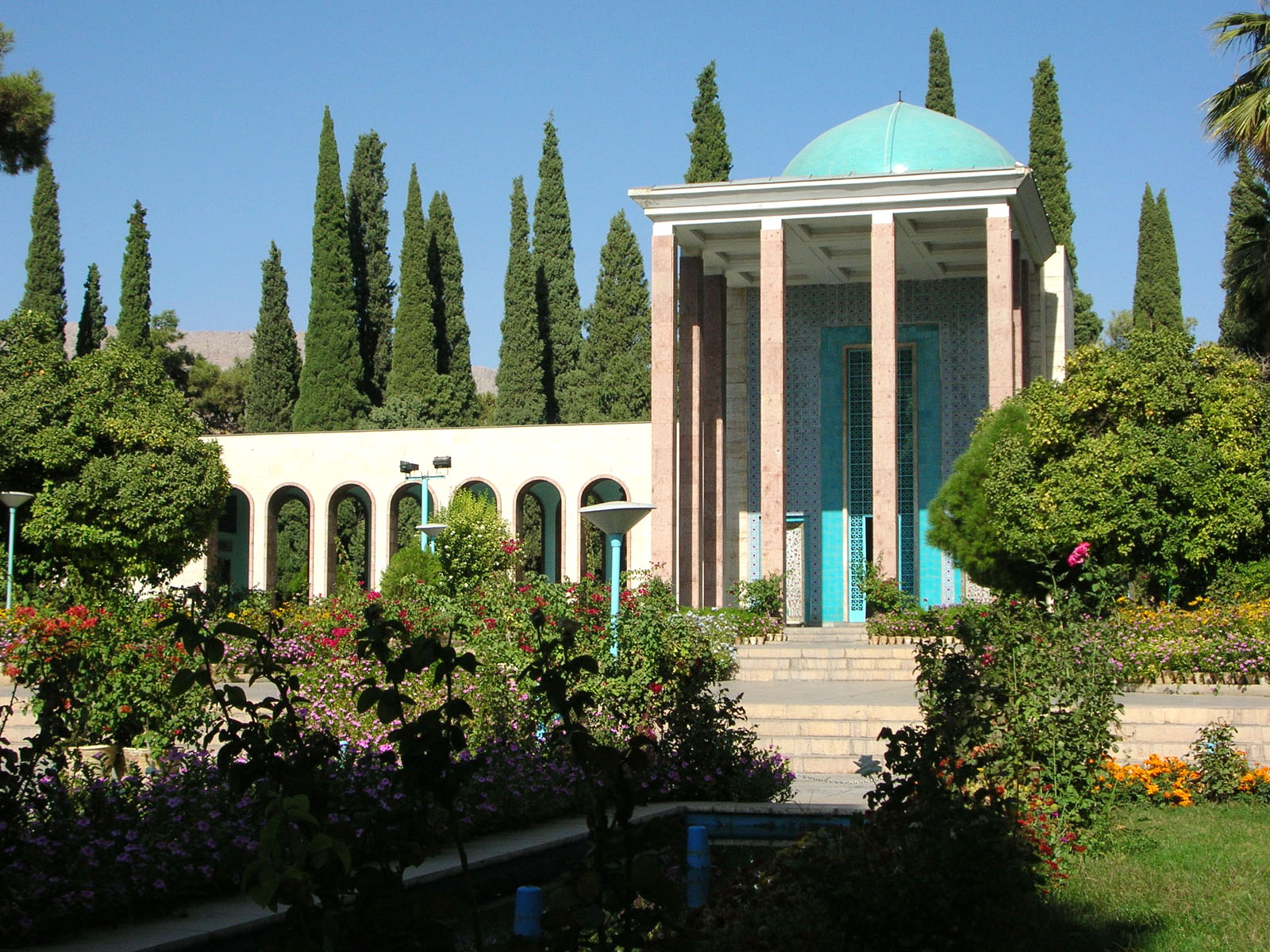
Tomb of Saadi

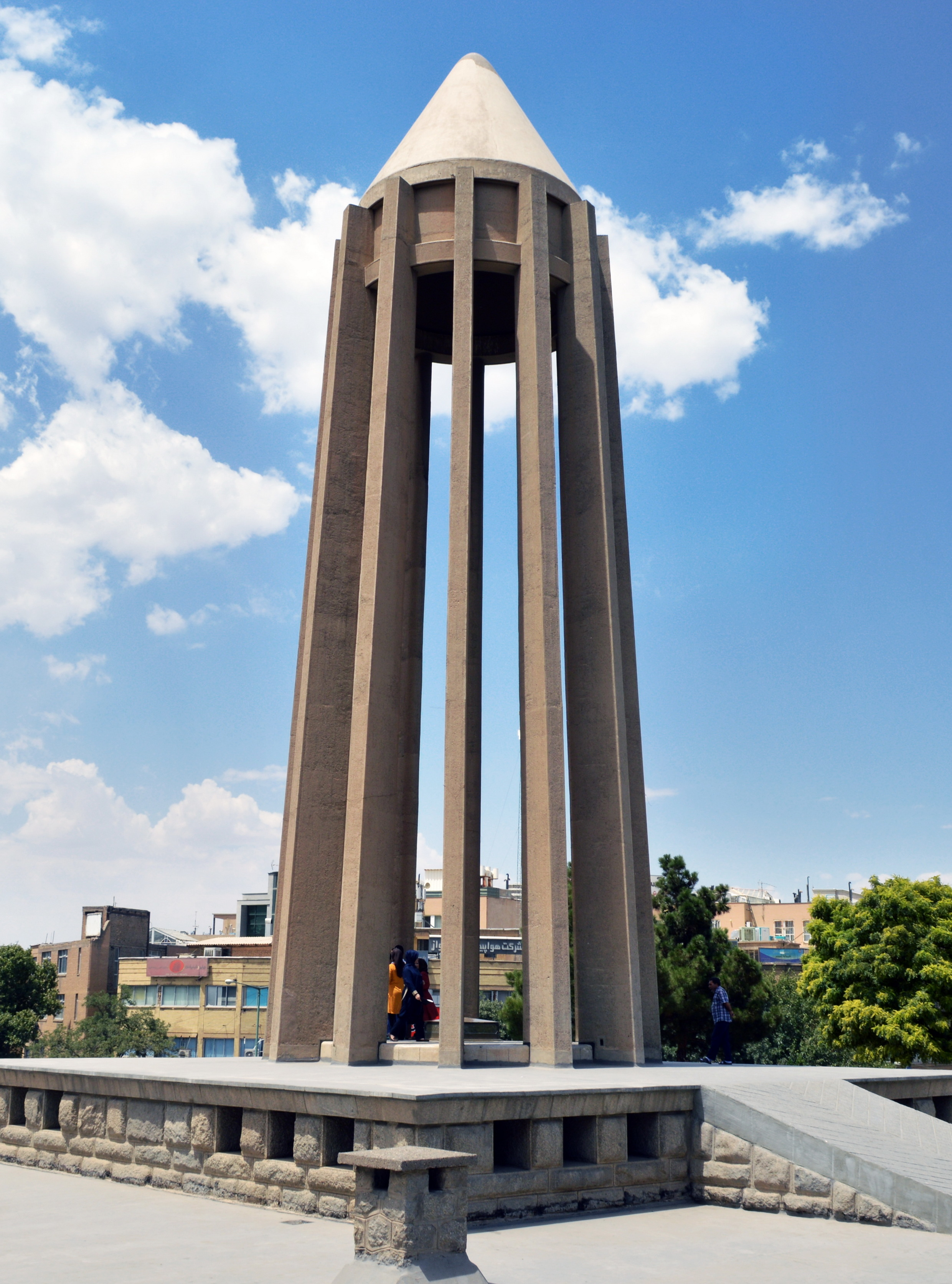
Tomb of Avicenna

=== Architectural elements ===
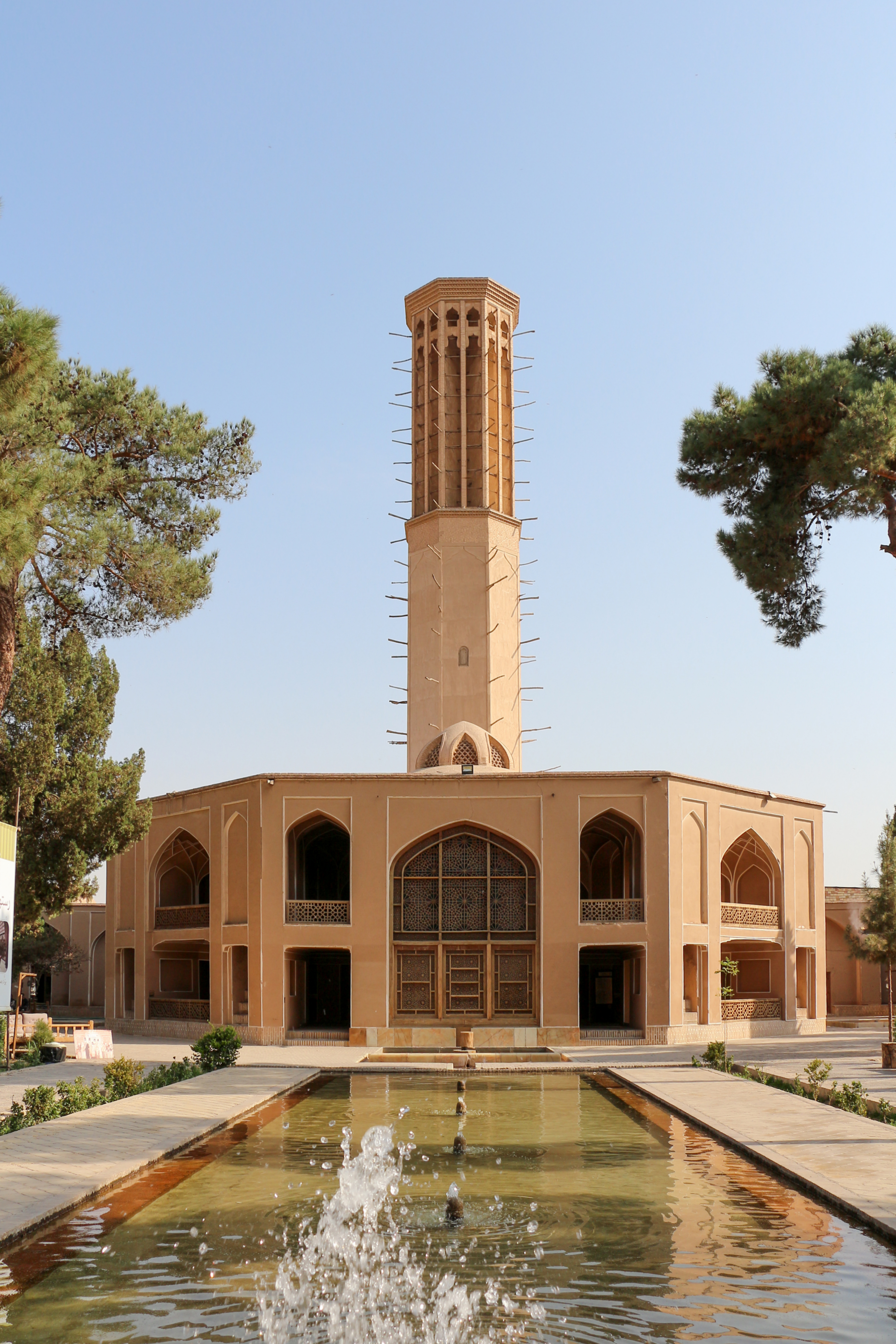
Windcatcher (badgir)

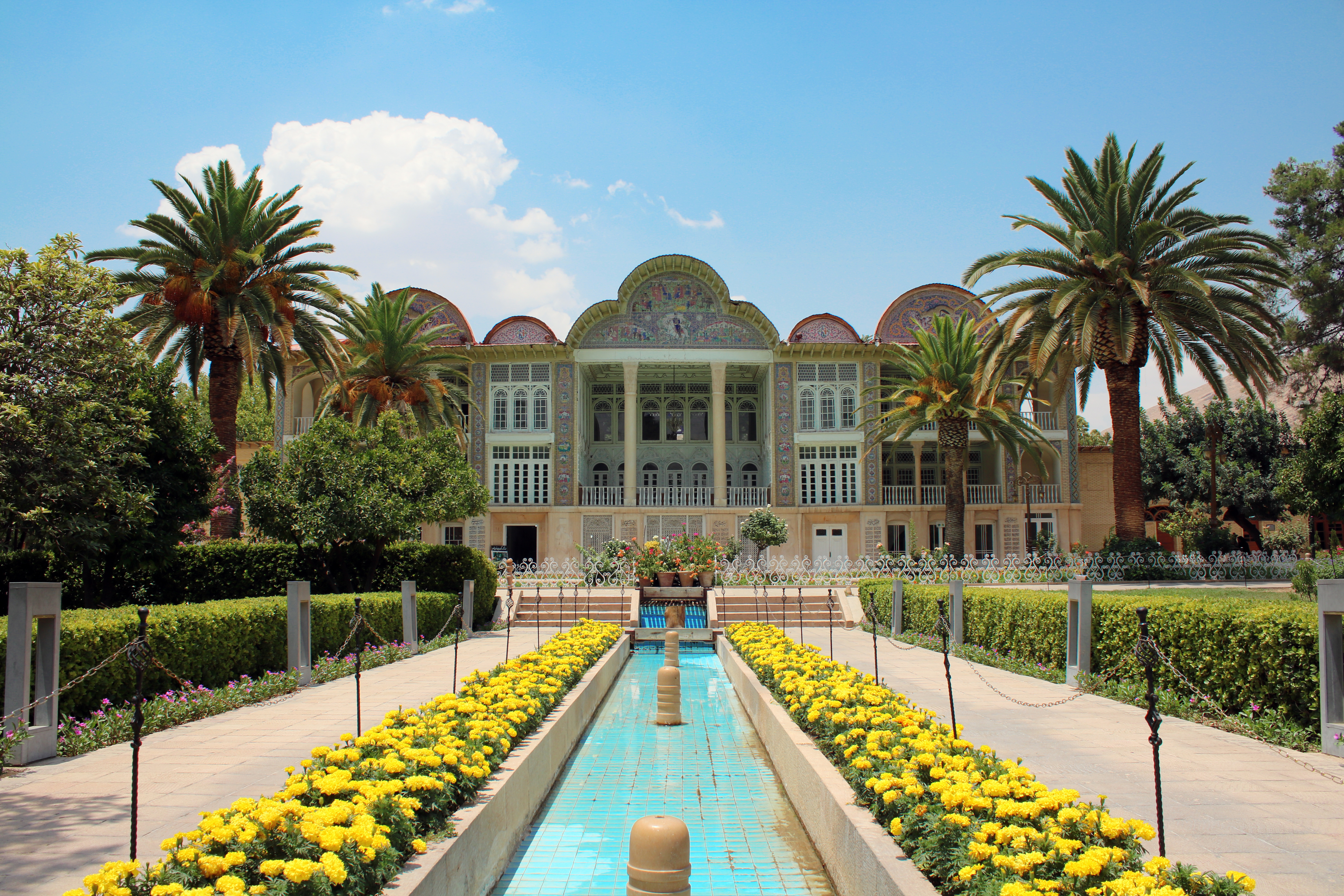
Persian garden

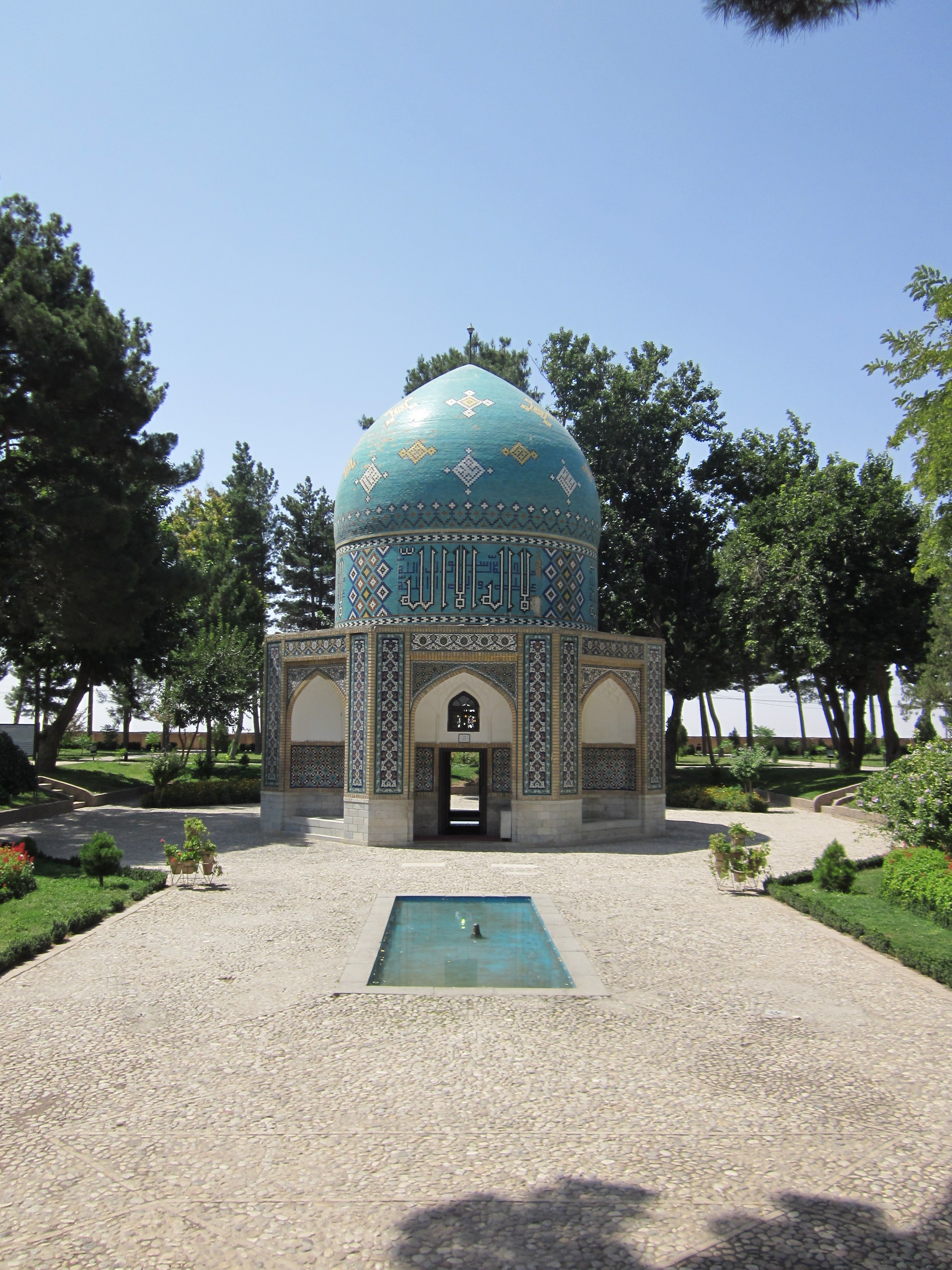
Dome (in Iranian architecture)

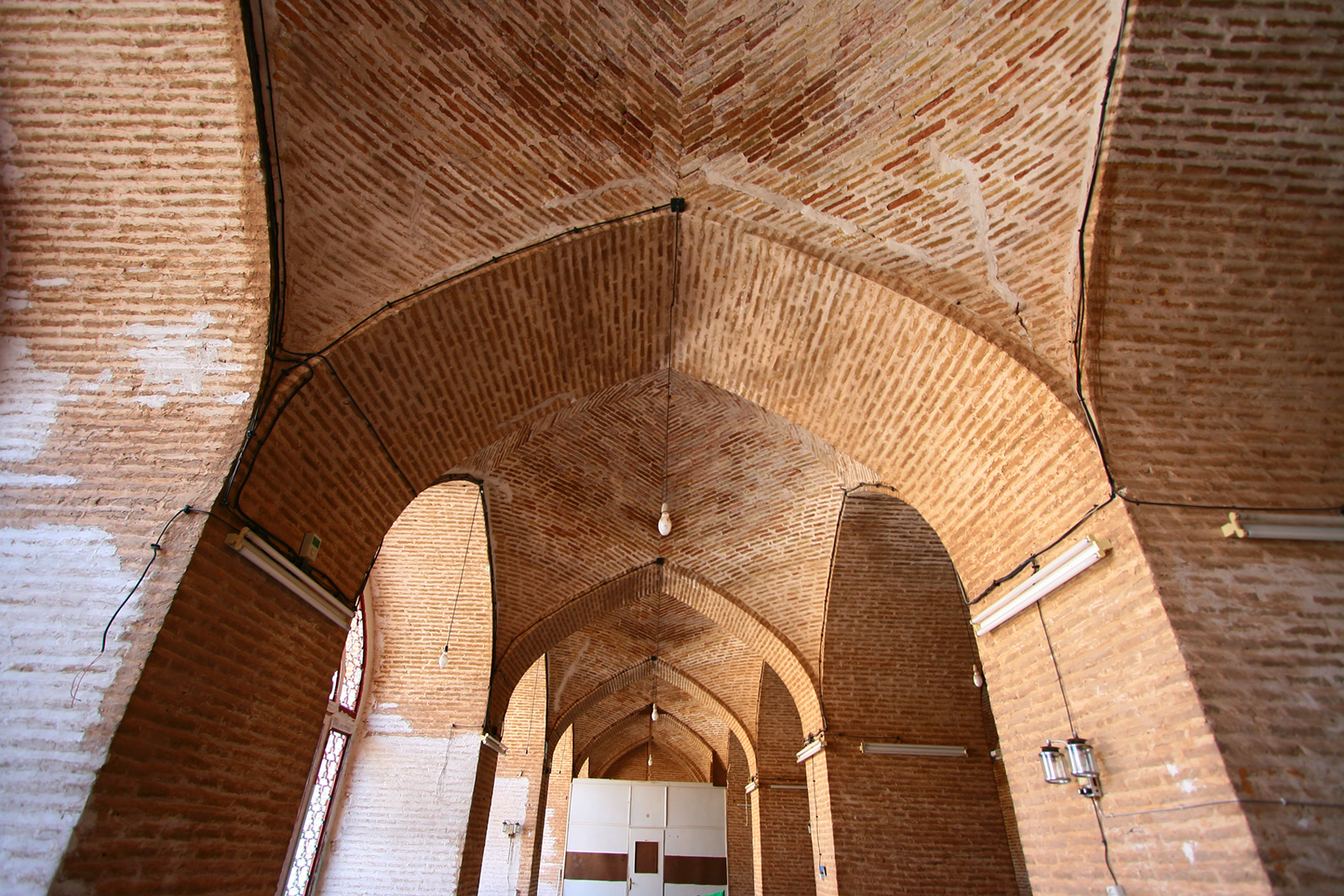
Iwan

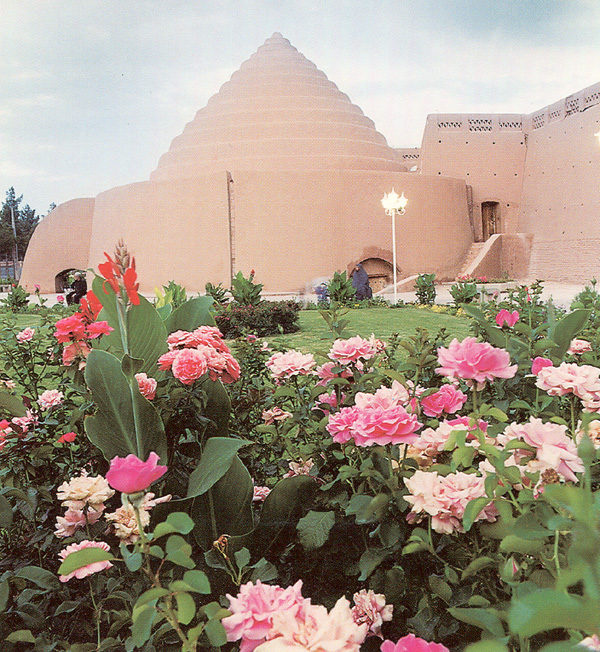
Yakhchal (traditional ice house)

== Cultural symbols ==
- Mithraism
- Boteh jegheh

=== Haft-Seen ===
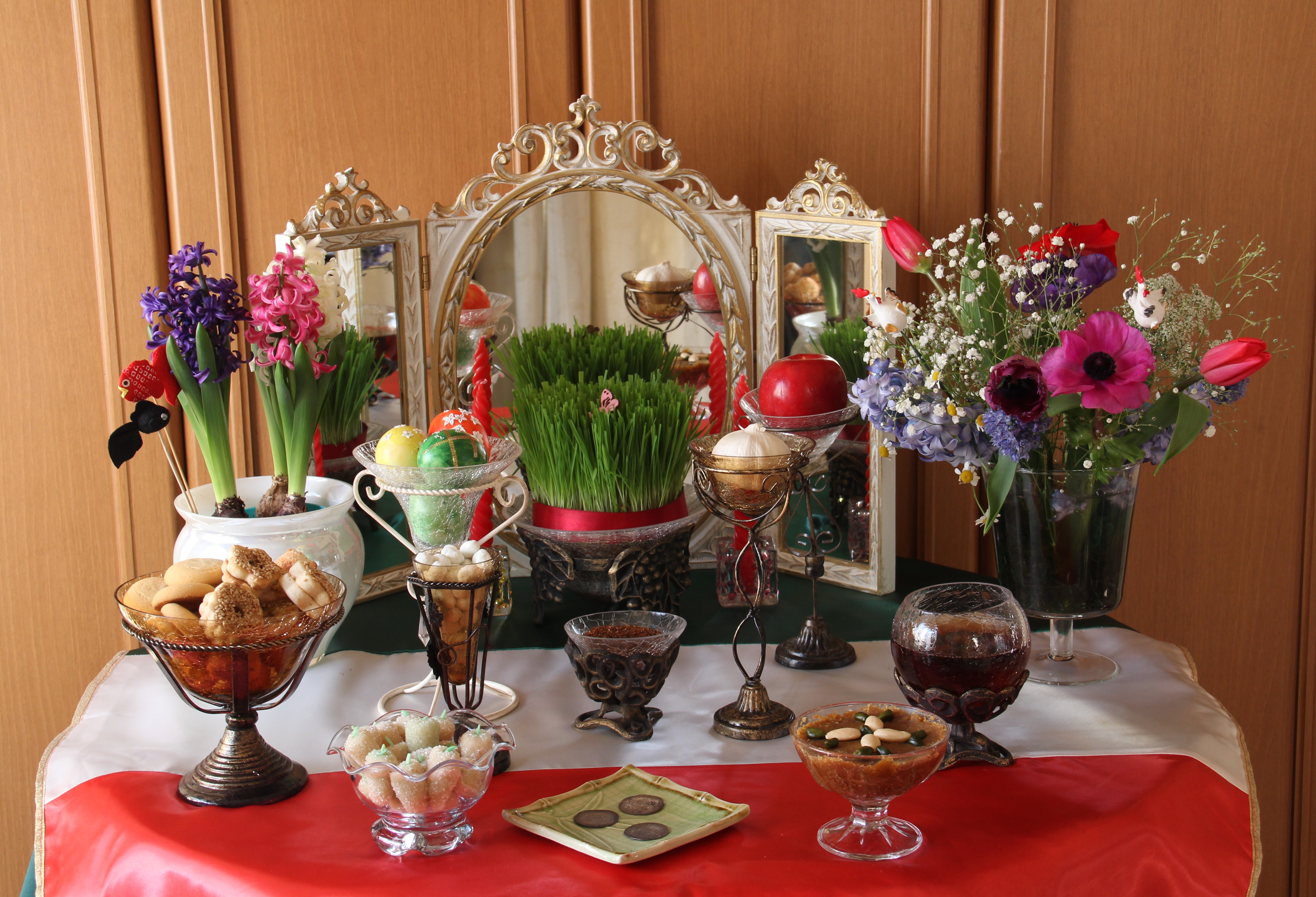
A Haft-Seen table placed on the Flag of Iran.

The Haft-Seen (Persian: هفت‌سین) is a traditional table setting of seven symbolic items whose names begin with the Persian letter sin (س), drawn from nature. It is a central custom of Nowruz, the Iranian New Year, typically arranged on the floor or a table. Families gather around it at the moment of the vernal equinox. The core seven items are: apple (sib), wheat or barley sprouts (sabzeh), sumac (somāq), garlic (sīr), vinegar (serkeh), sprouted wheat pudding (samanu), and oleaster (senjed). Additional elements often include a mirror, candles, colored eggs, a goldfish, flowers, the Quran or Divan of Hafez, sweets, and other items varying by regional custom and belief. The table usually remains in place throughout the Nowruz period, with some families releasing the sprouts and fish into water on Sizdah Bedar (the 13th day of Nowruz).

=== Holidays ===
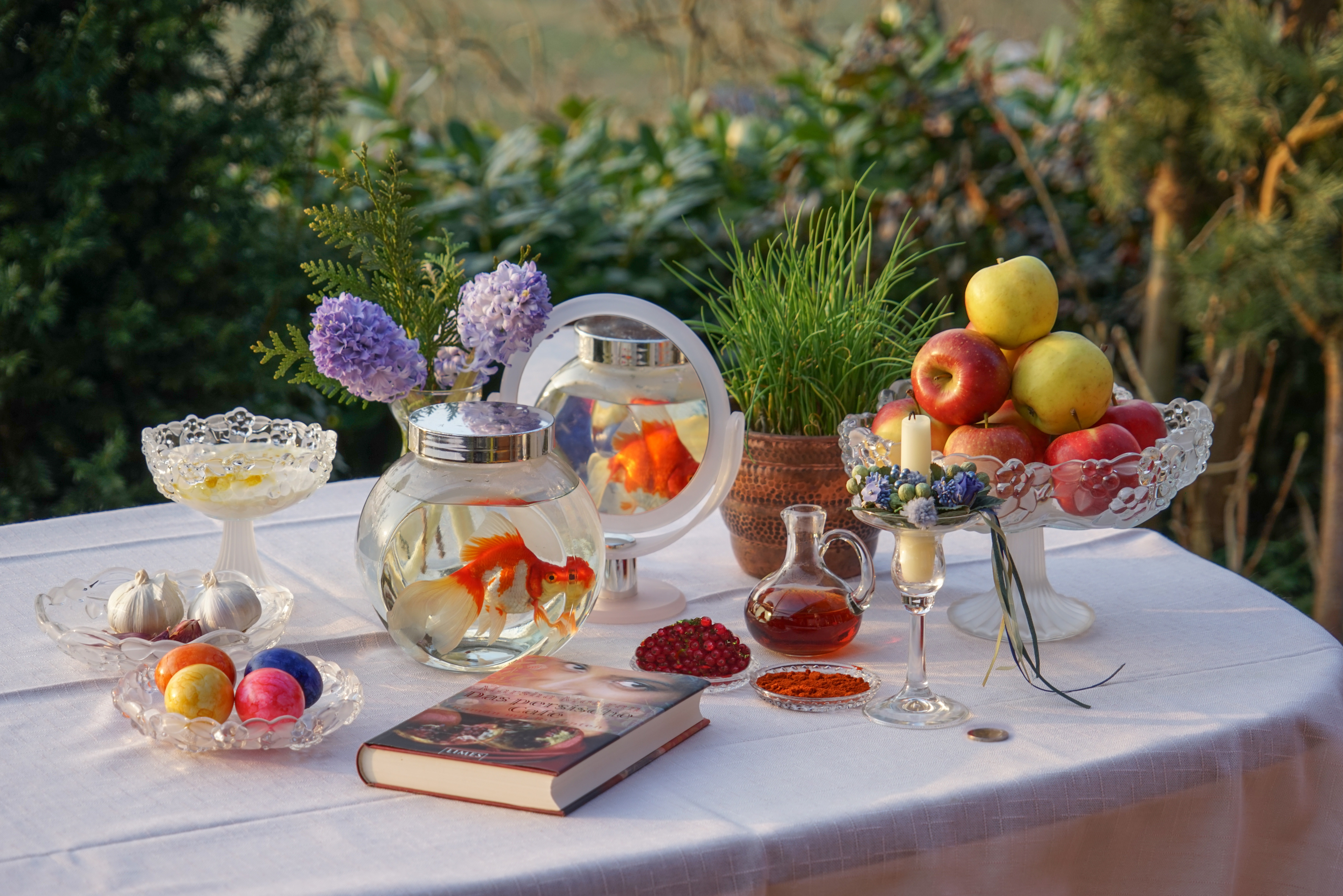
Nowruz

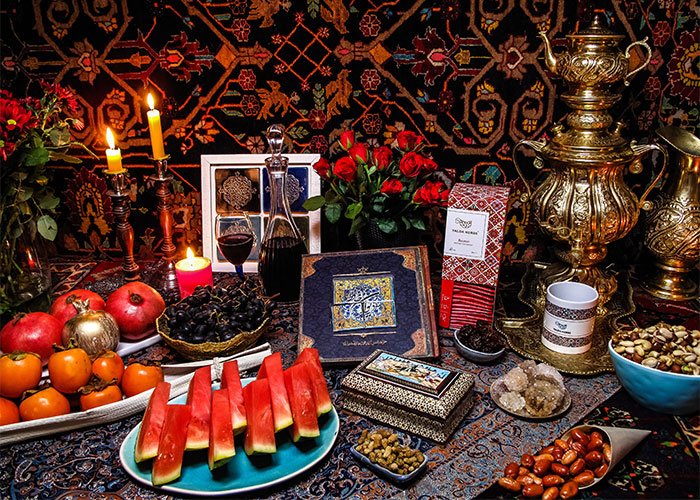
Yalda

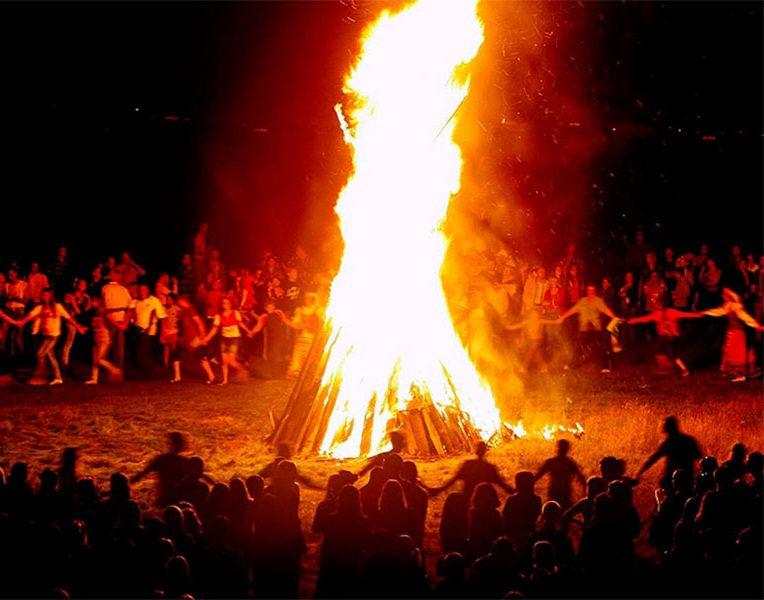
Chaharshanbe Suri

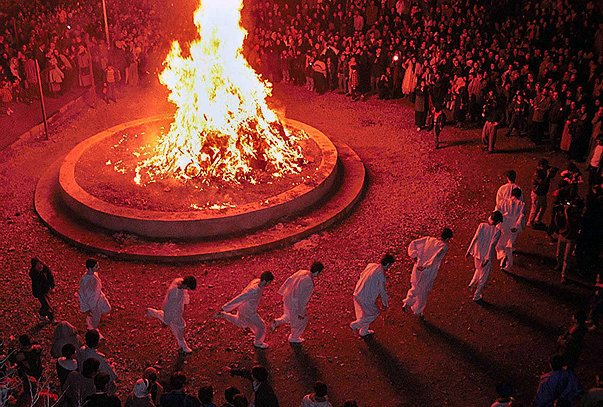
Sadeh

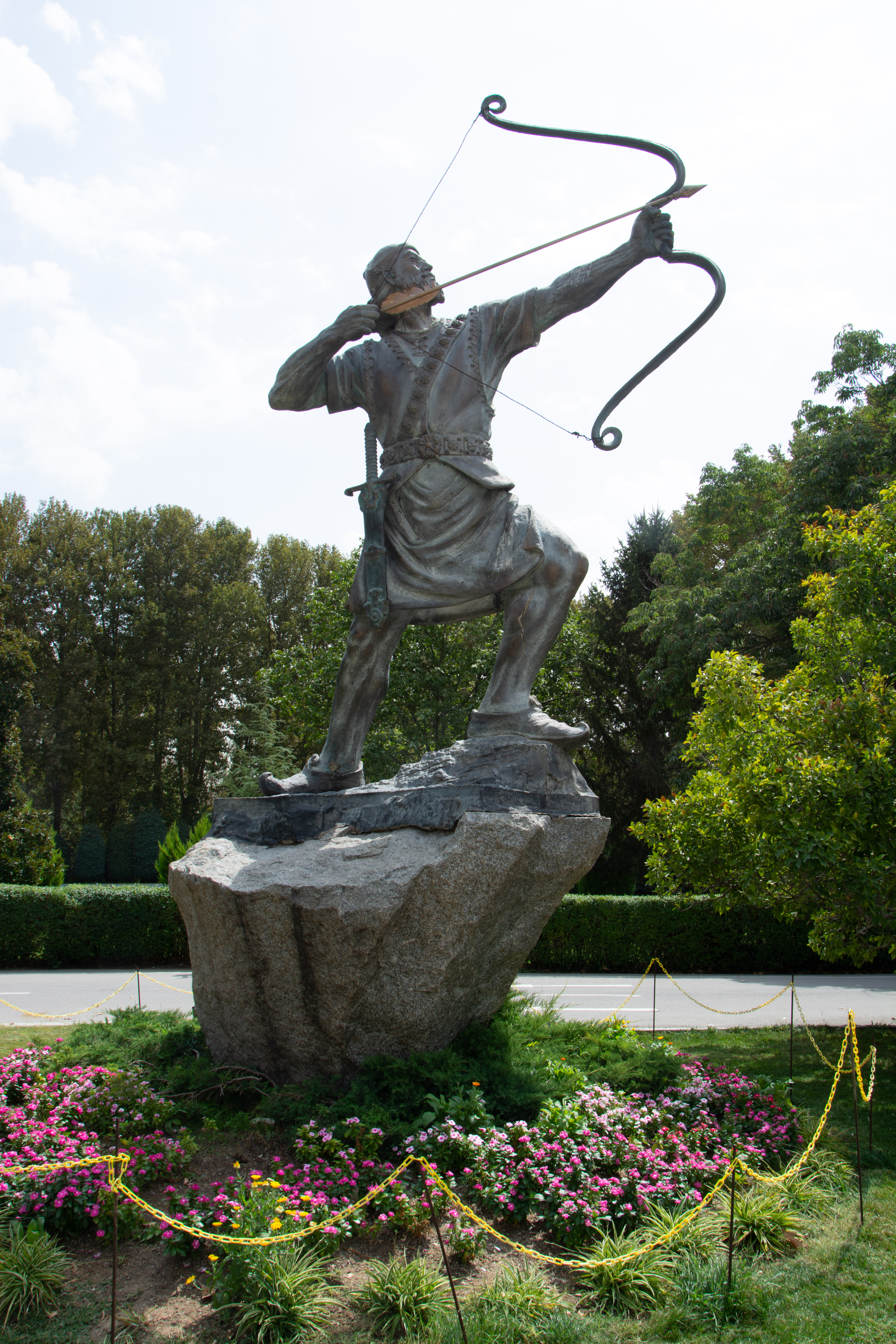
Tirgan

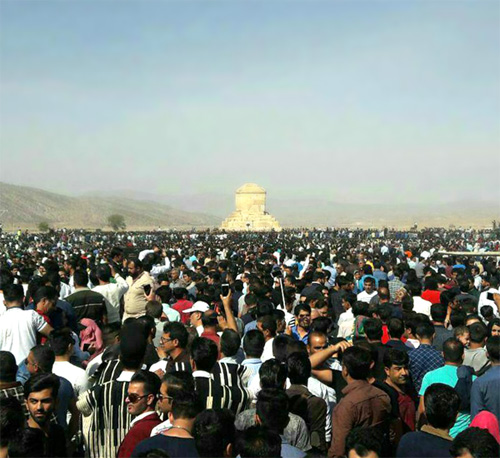
Cyrus the Great Day

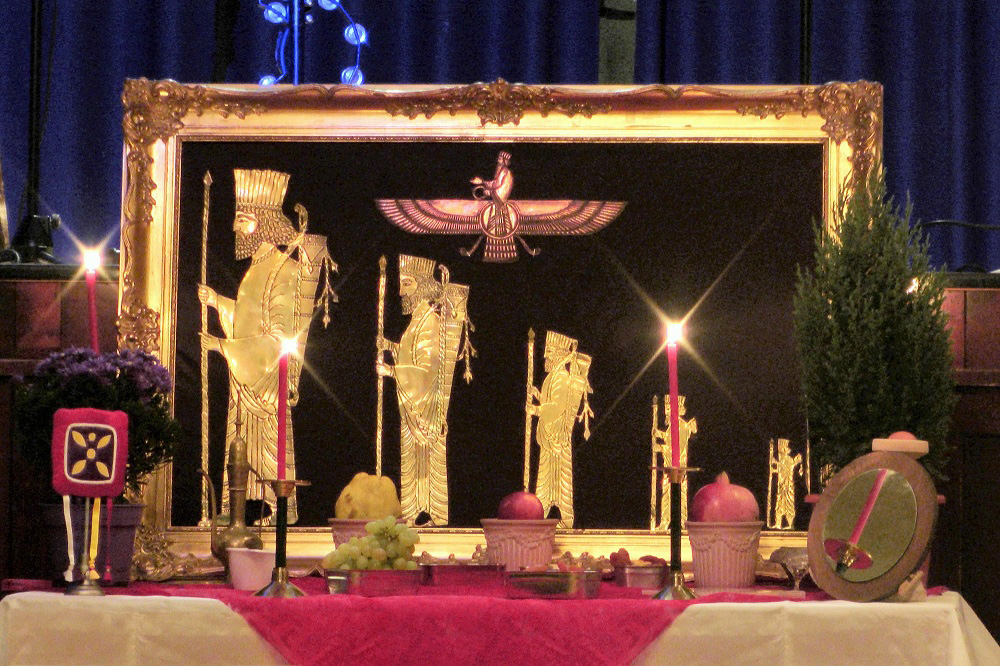
Mehregan

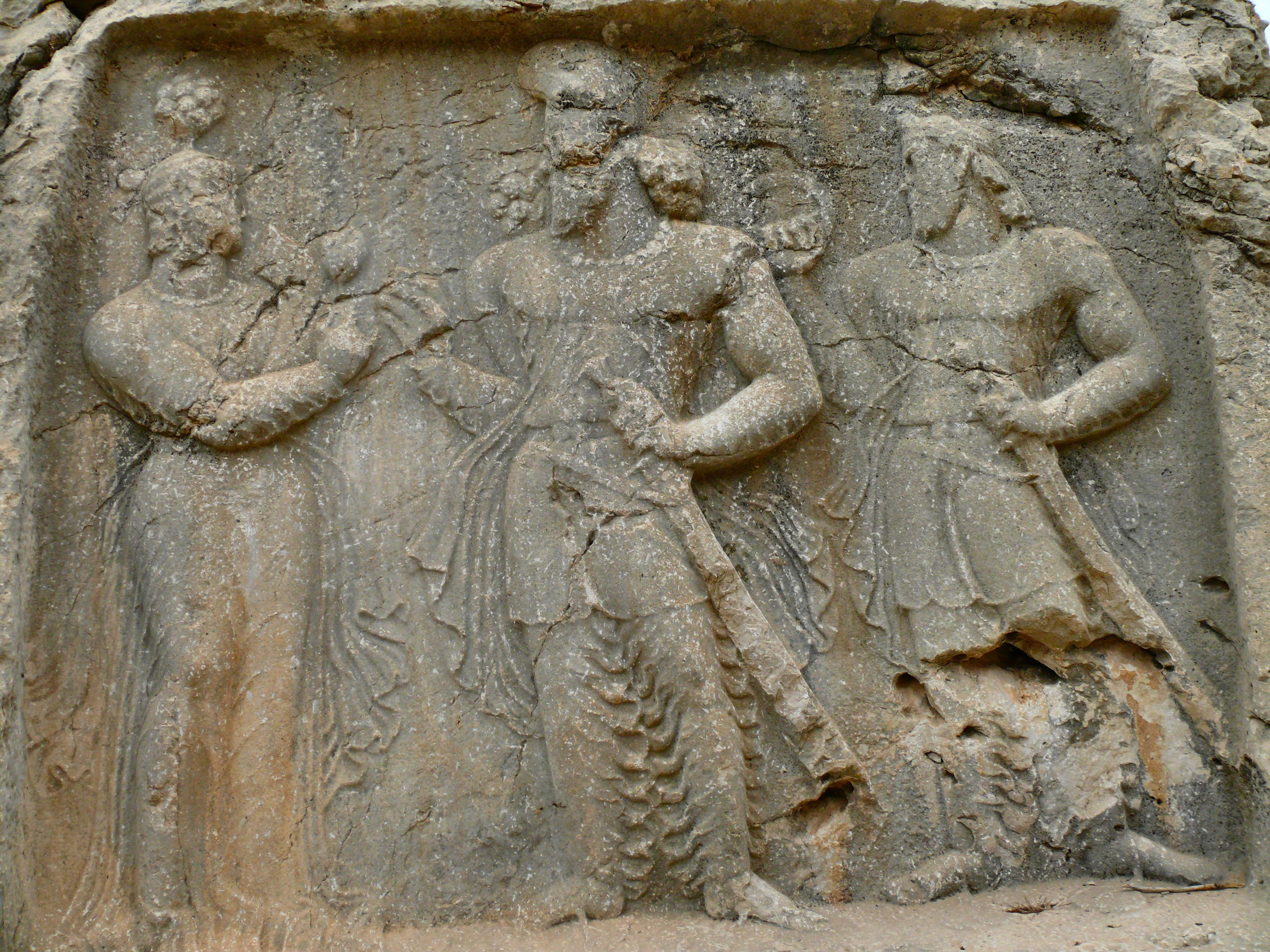
Sepandarmazgan

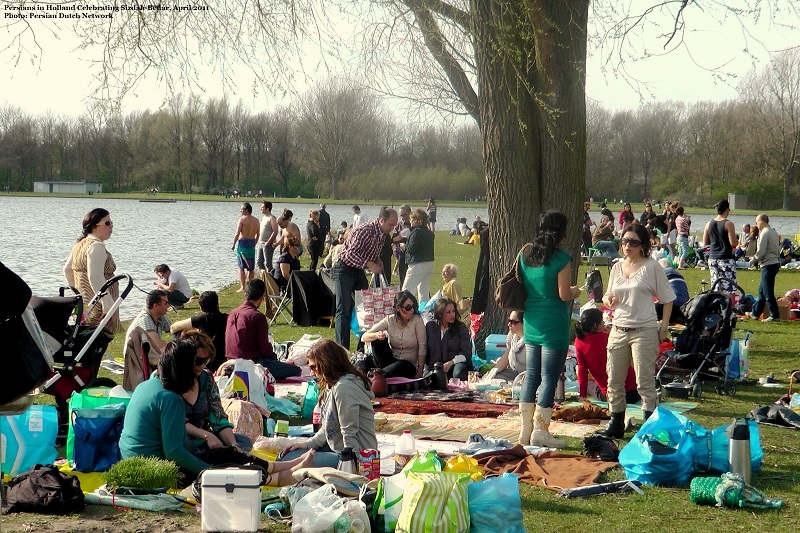
Sizdah Be-dar

=== Books ===
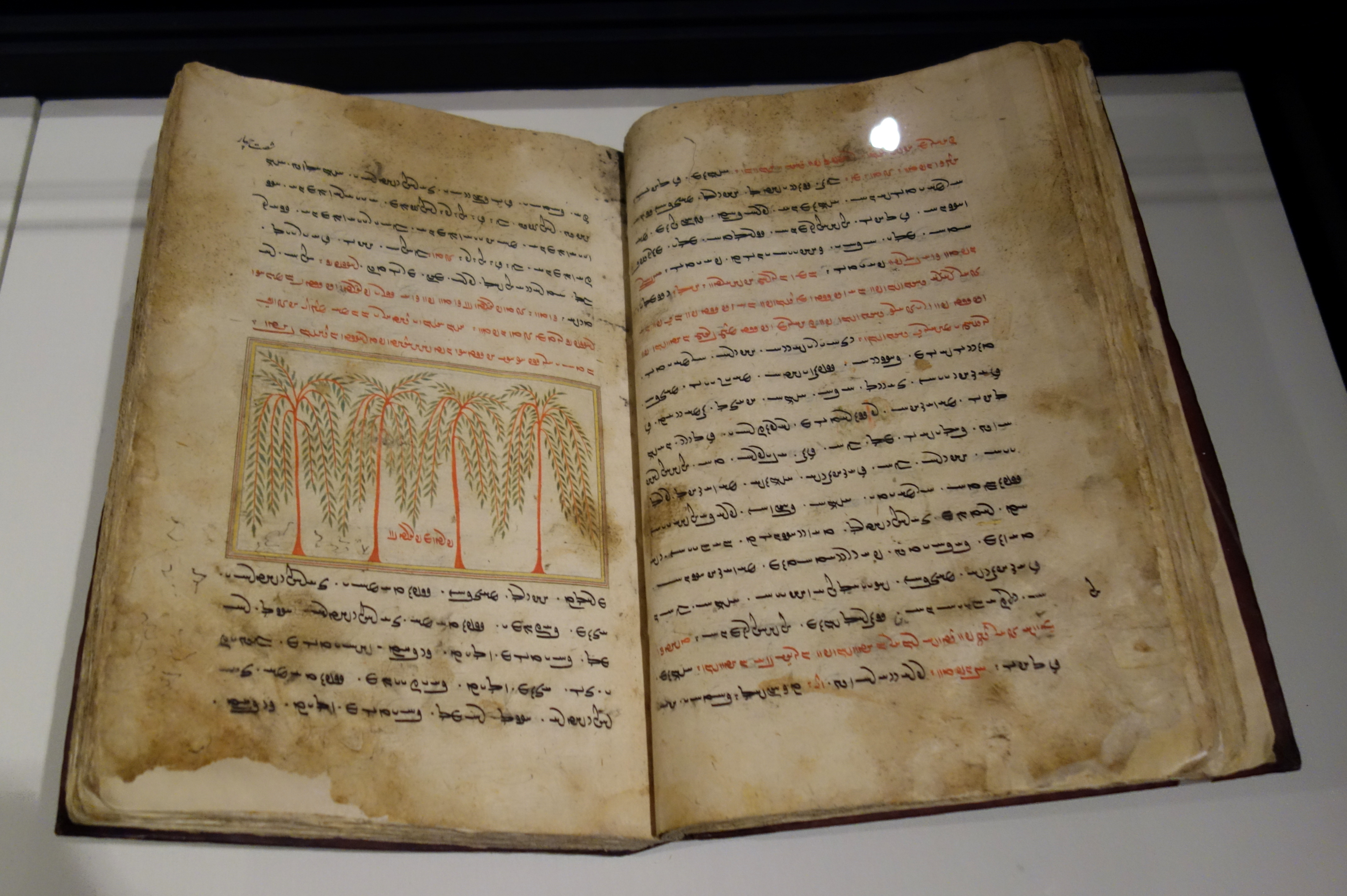
Avesta

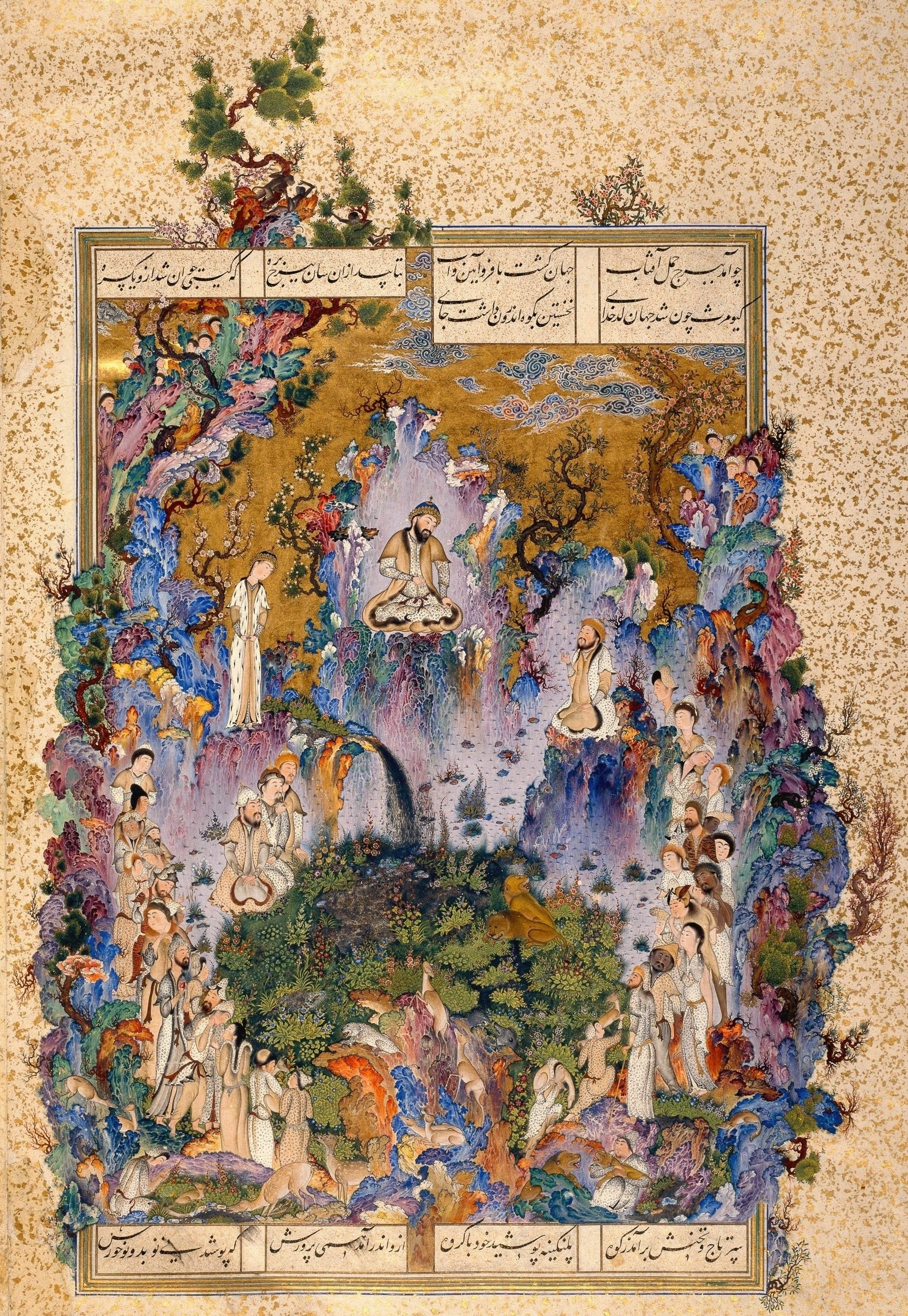
Shahname

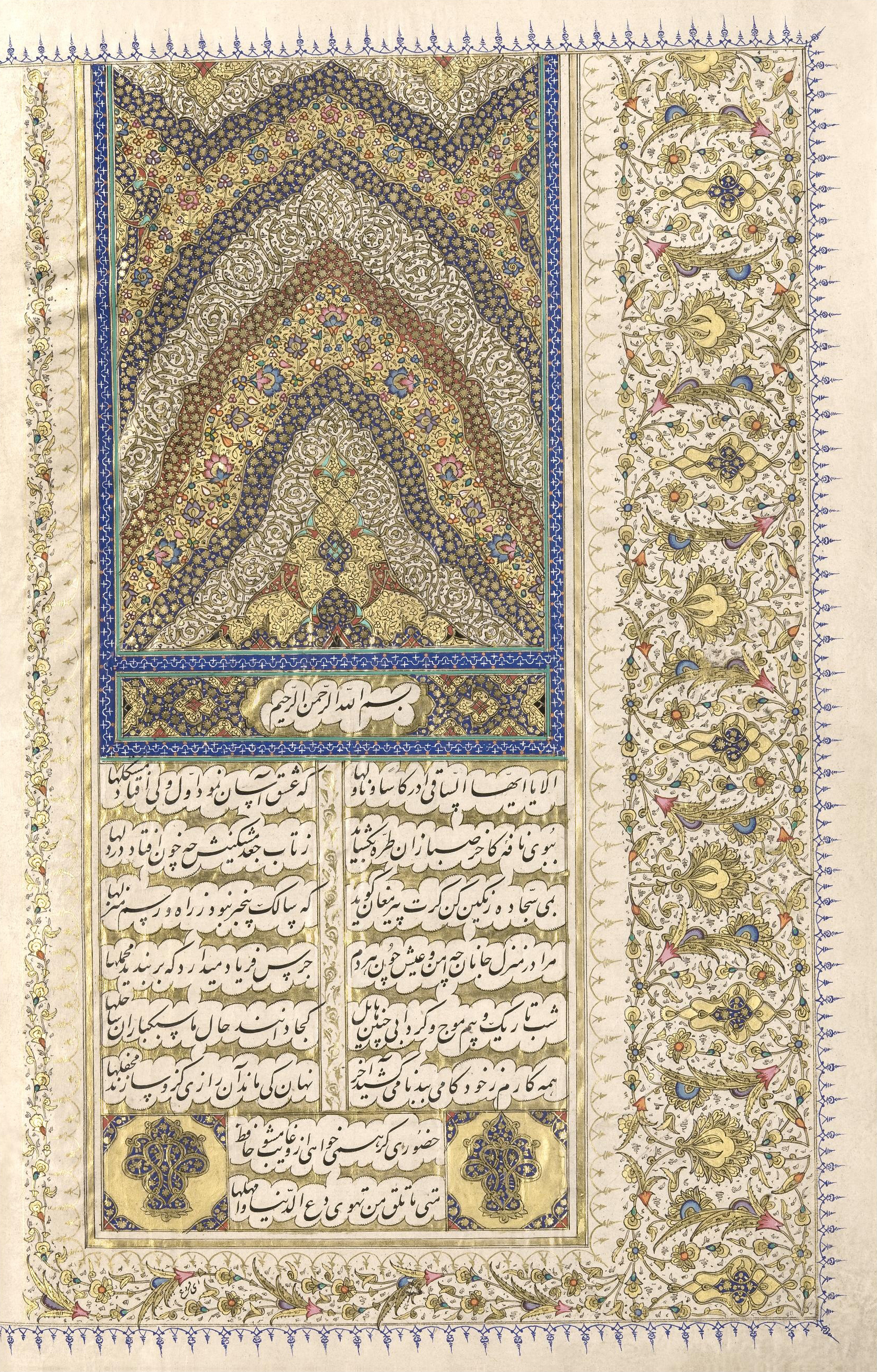
Divan of Hafez

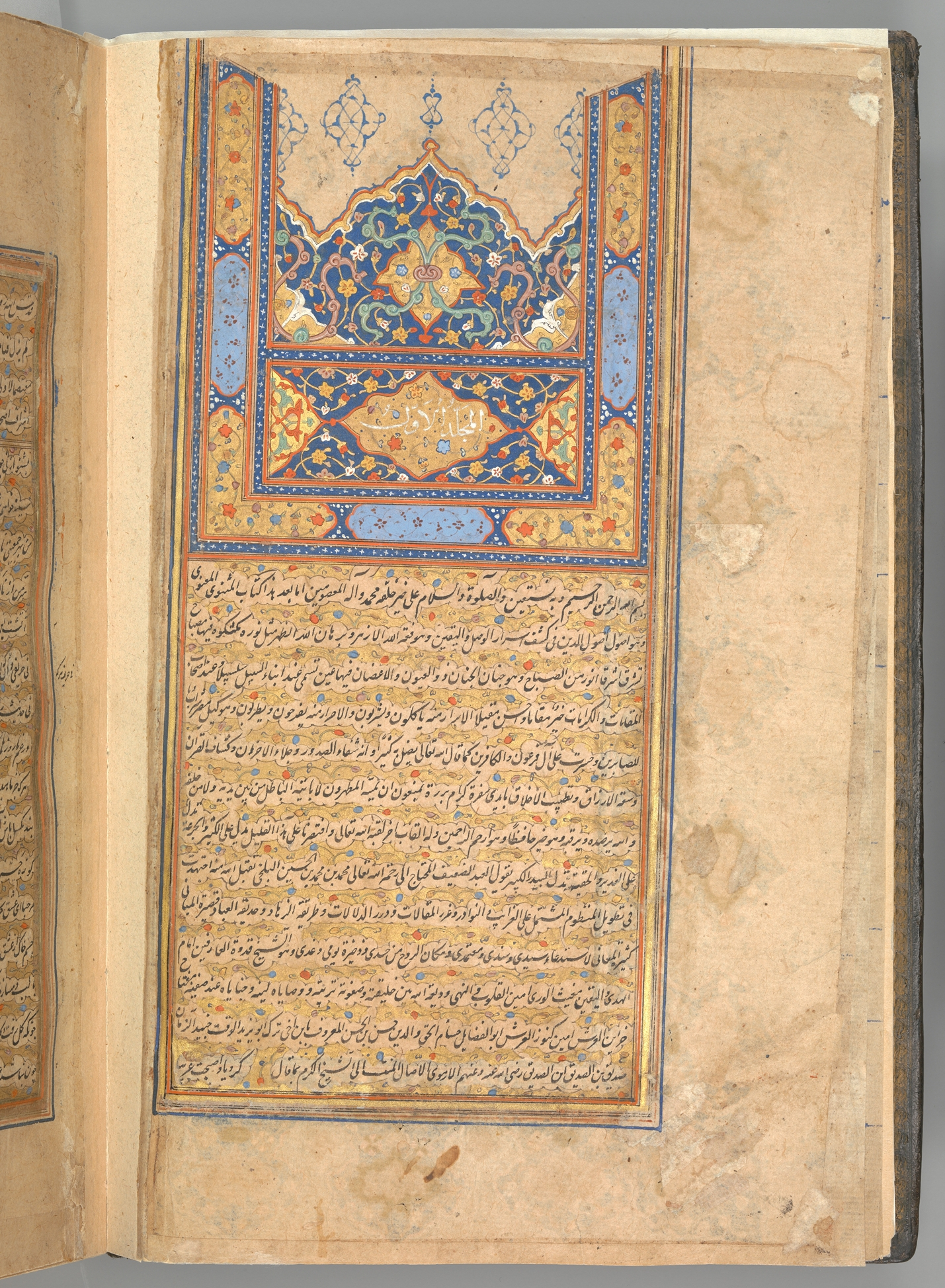
Masnavi (Rumi)

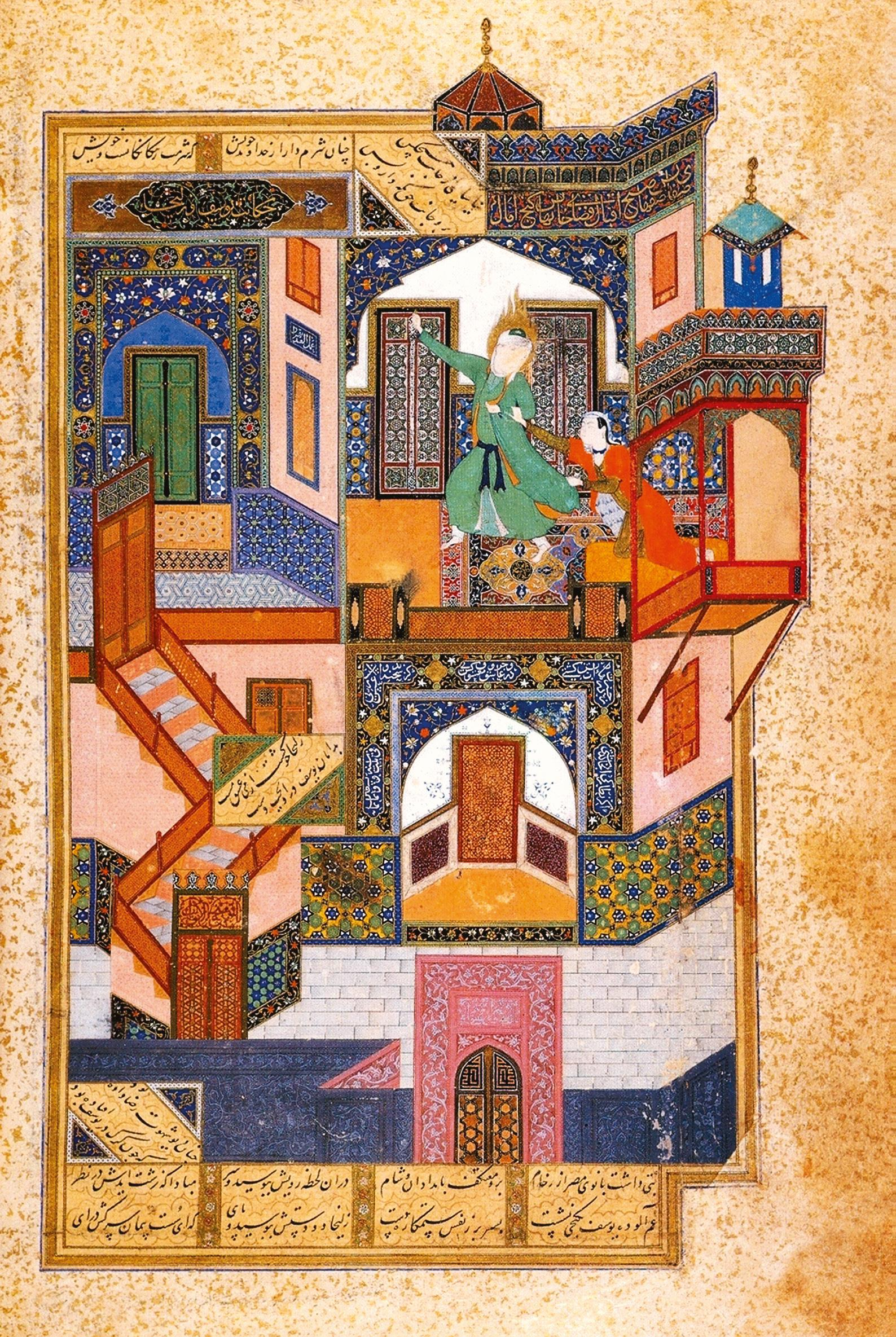
Bustan (Saadi)

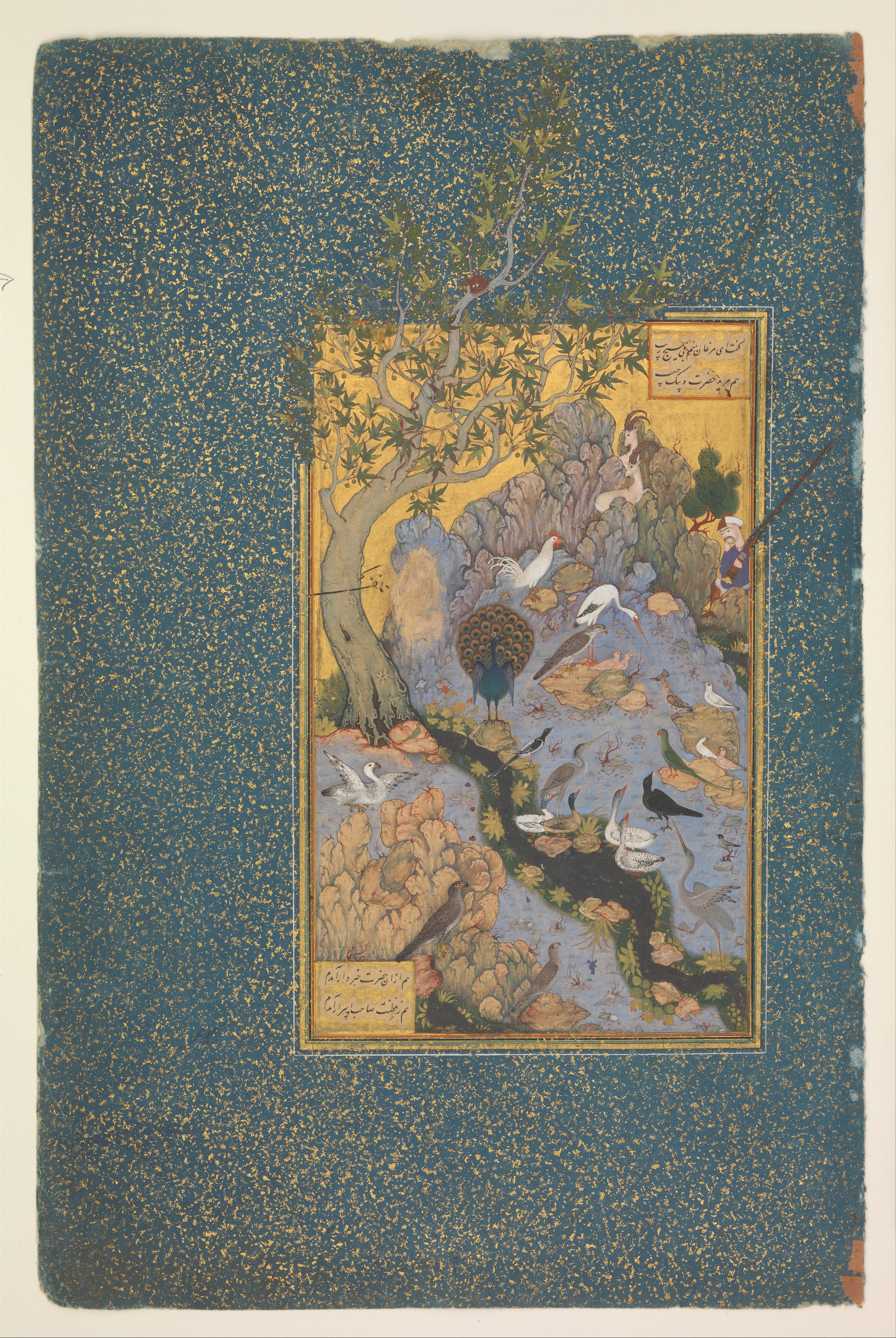
Conference of the Birds

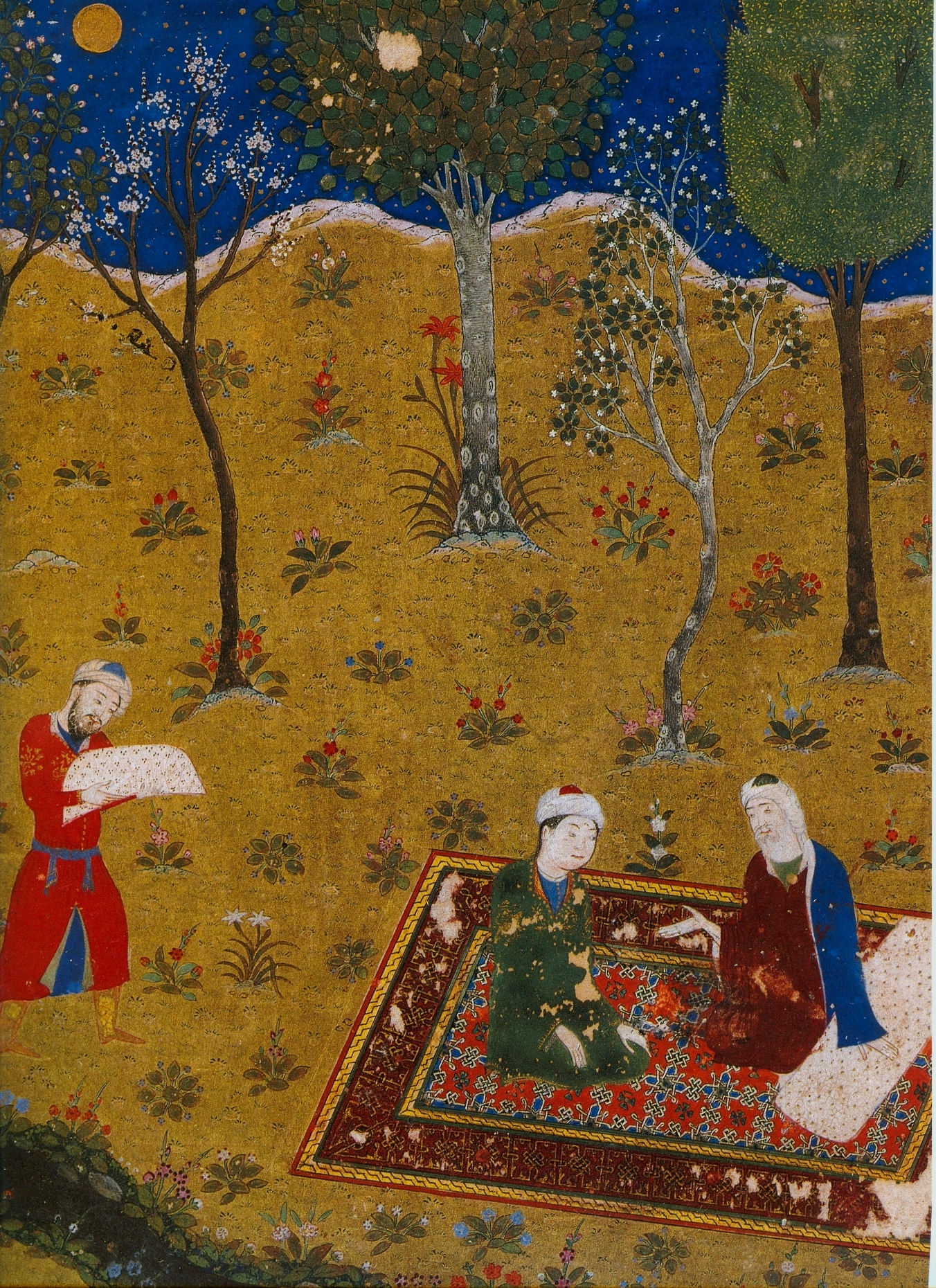
Golestan (Saadi)

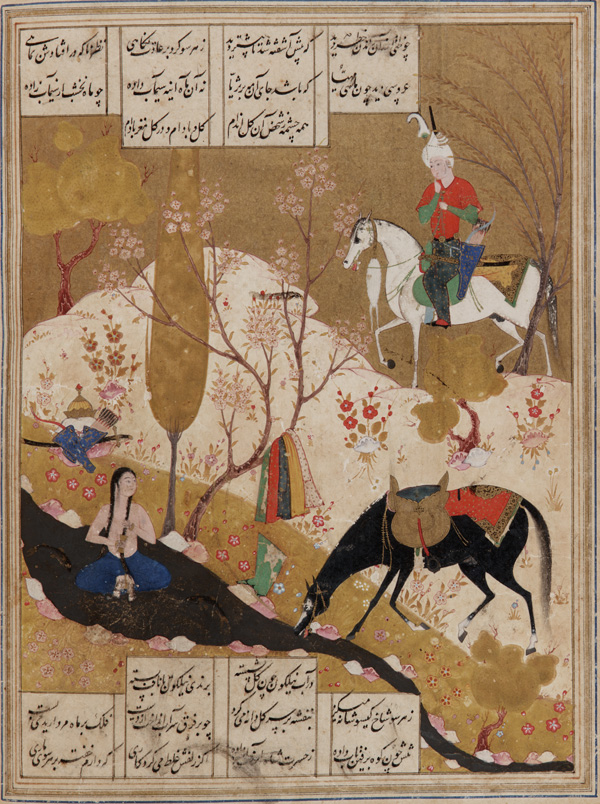
Khosrow and Shirin

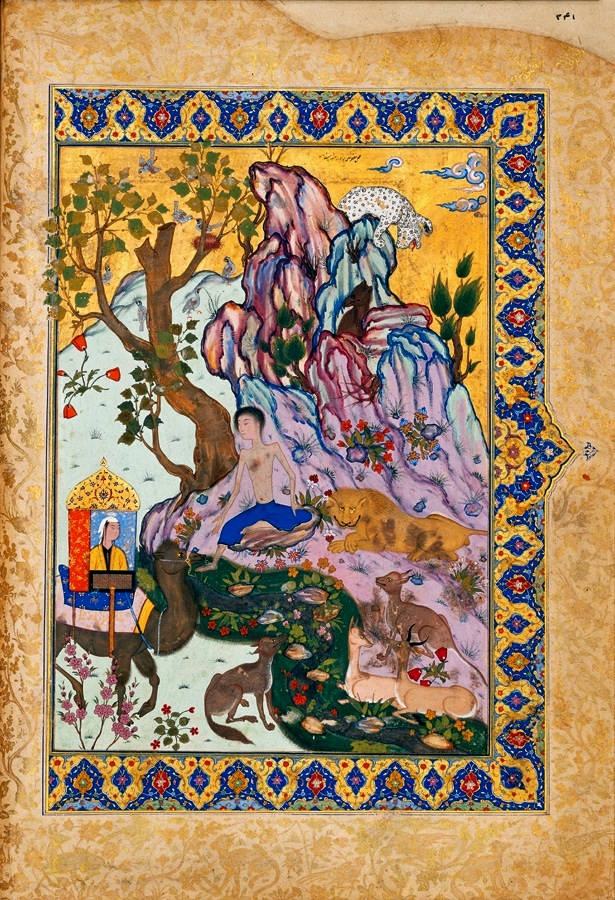
Layla and Majnun

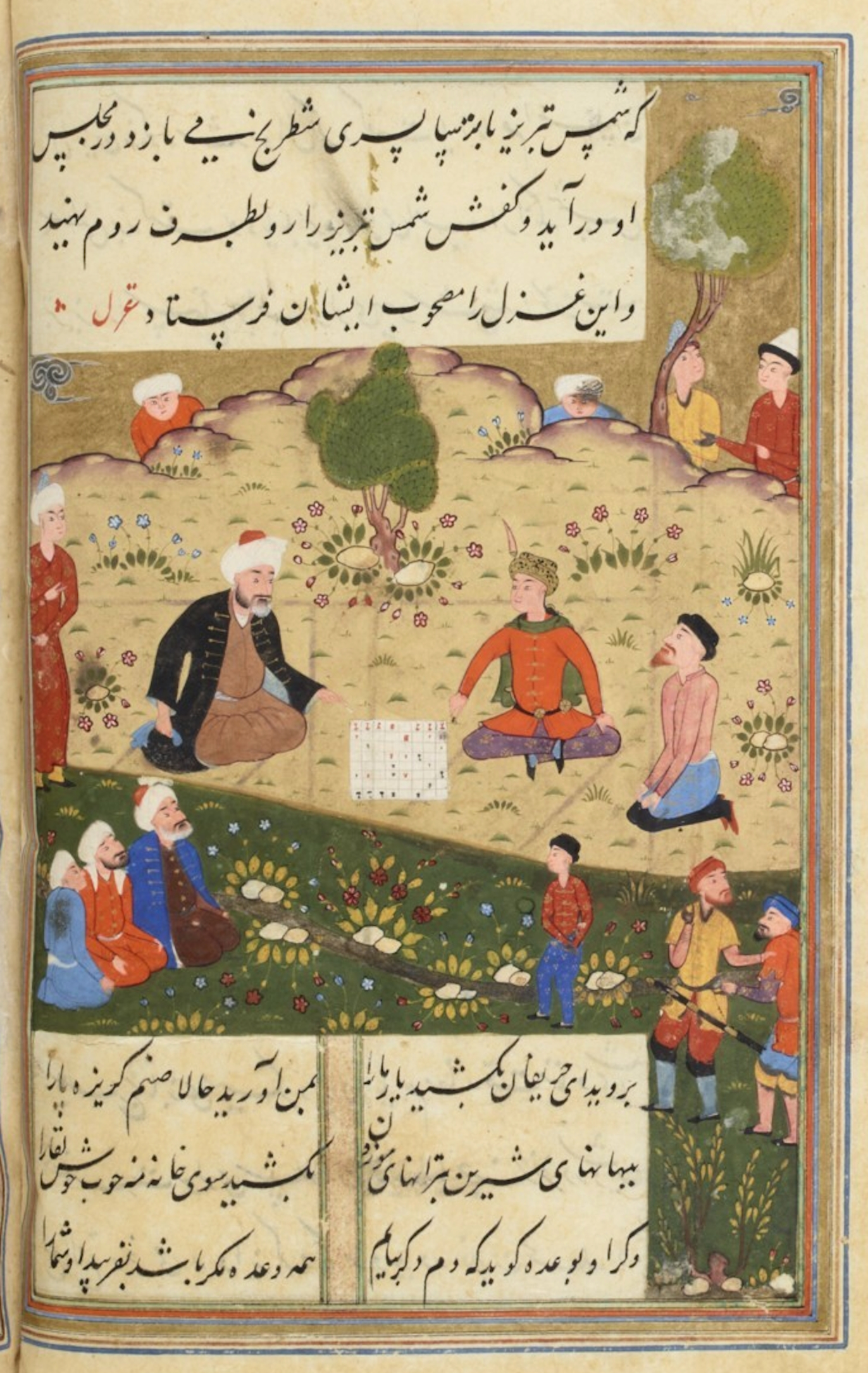
Divan-e Shams-e Tabrizi

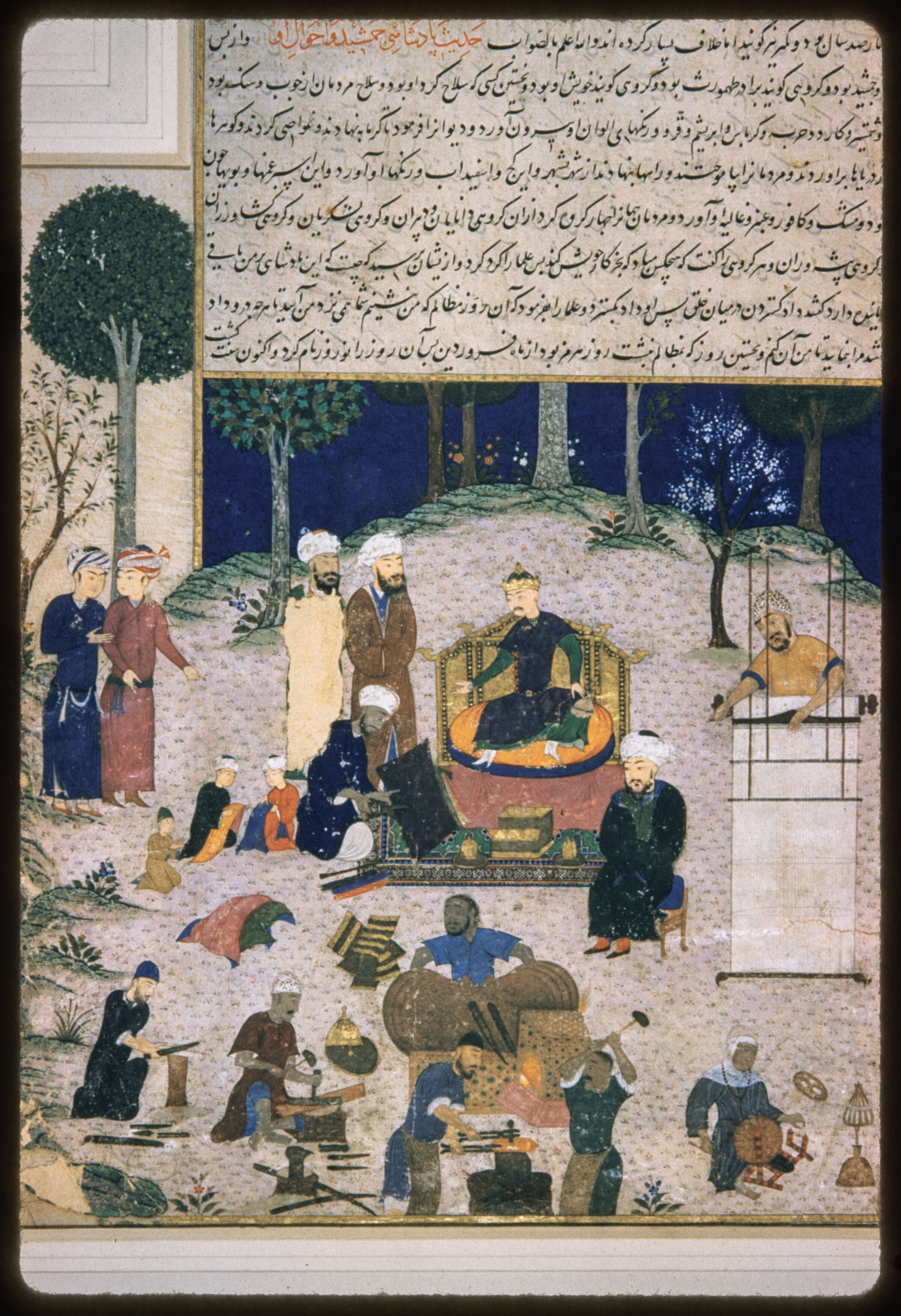
Tarikh al-Tabari

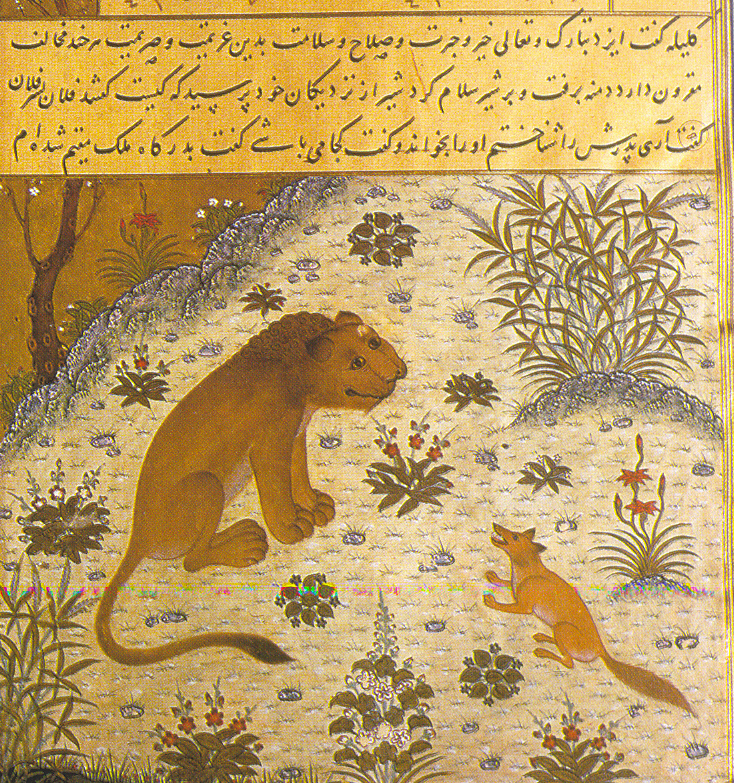
One Thousand and One Nights
- Denkard
- Bundahishn

=== Musical instruments ===
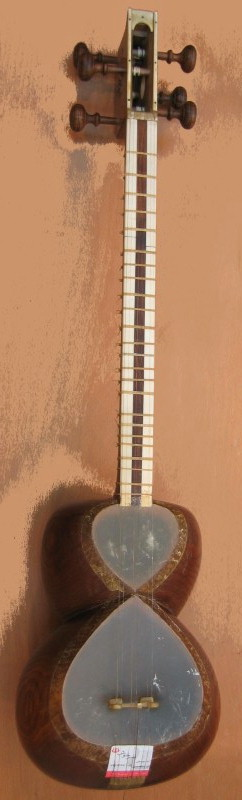
Tar

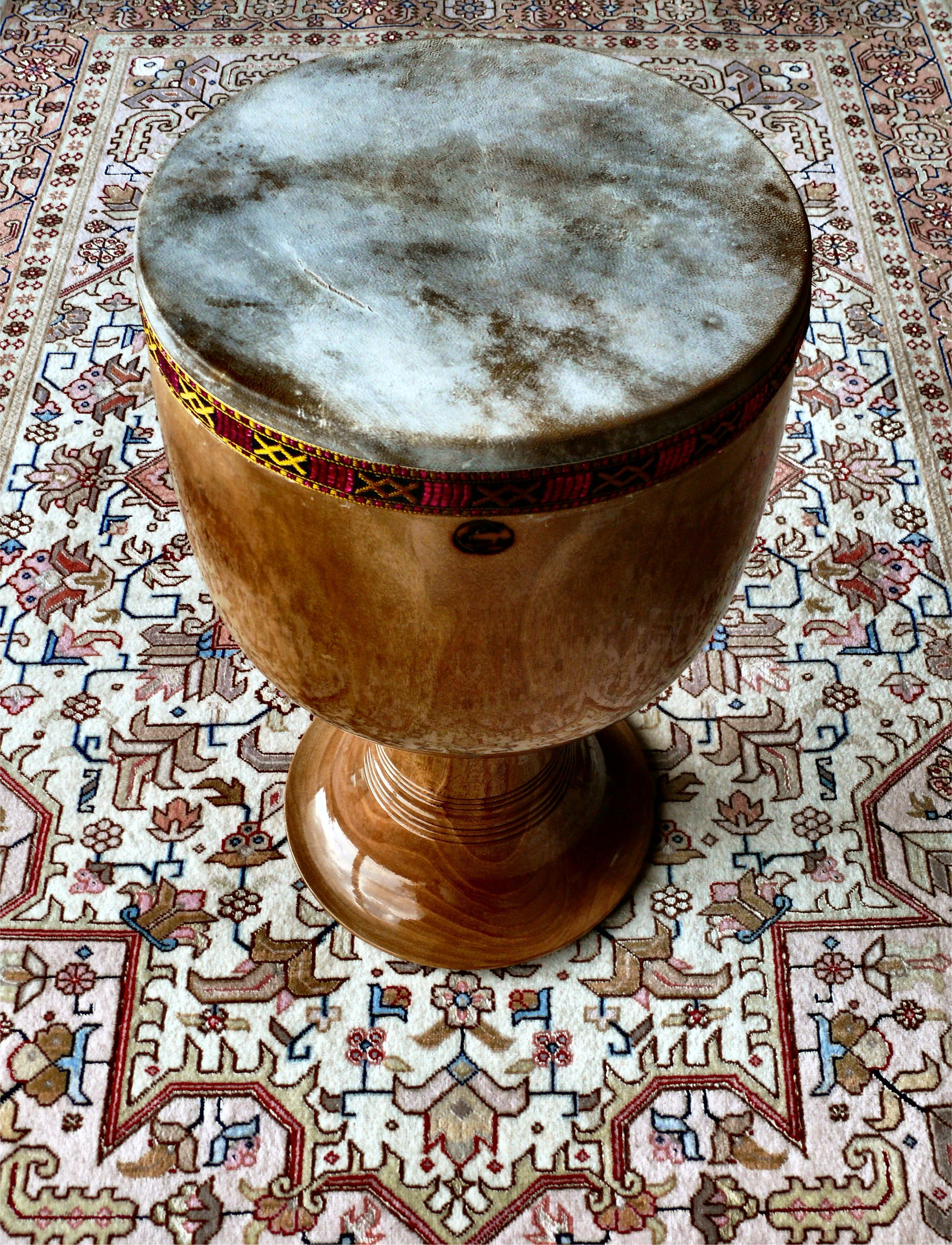
Tombak

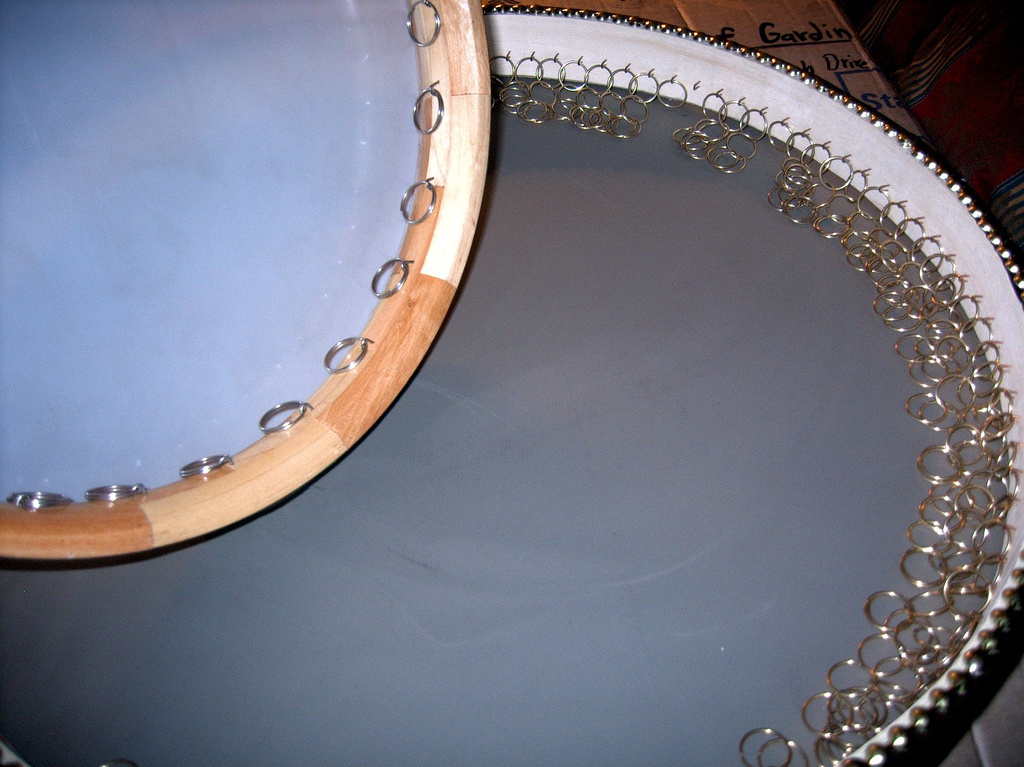
Daf

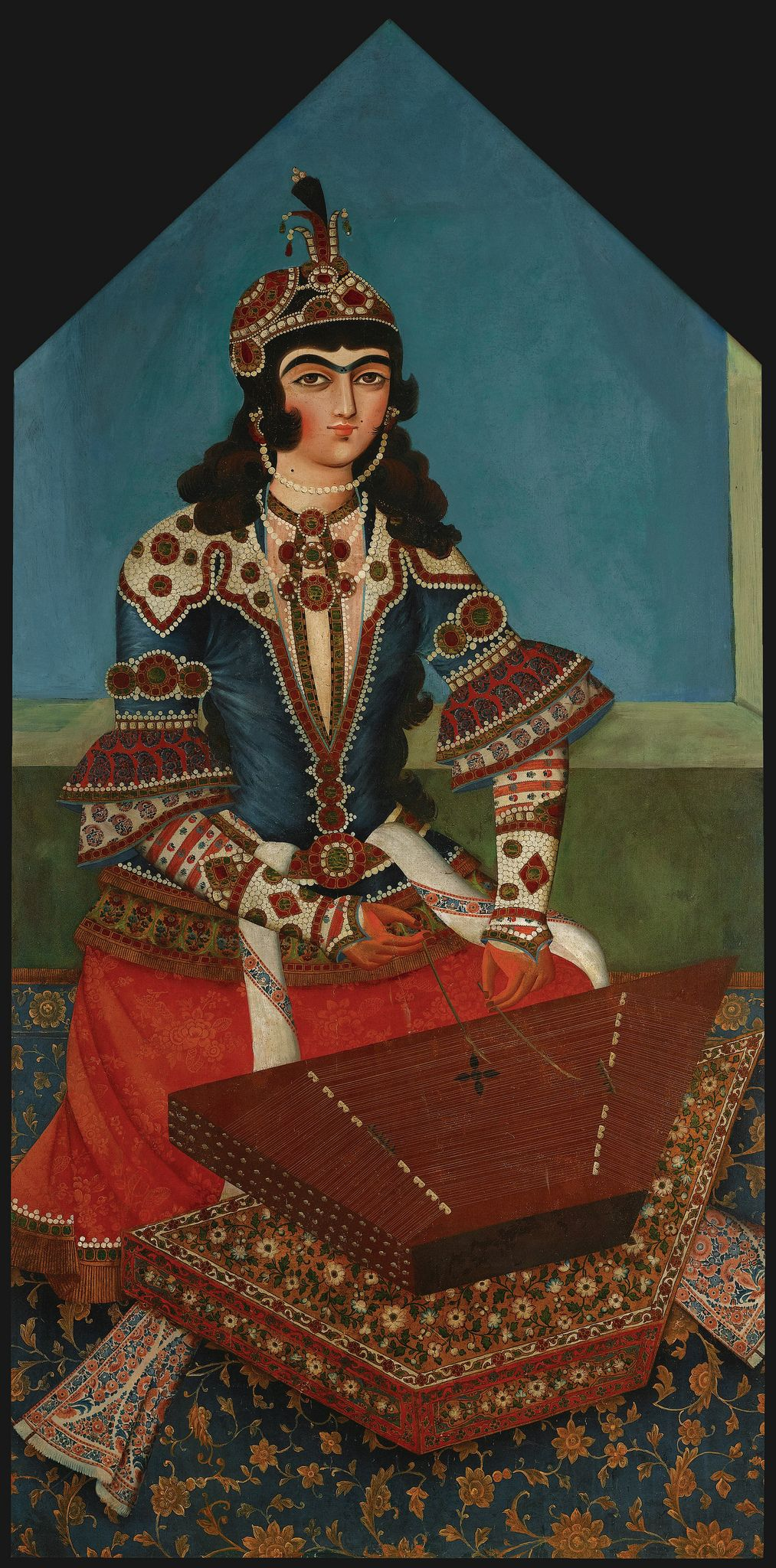
Santur

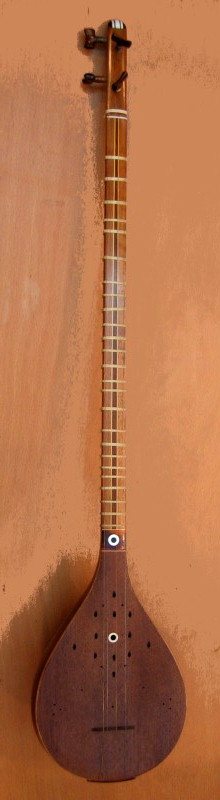
Setar

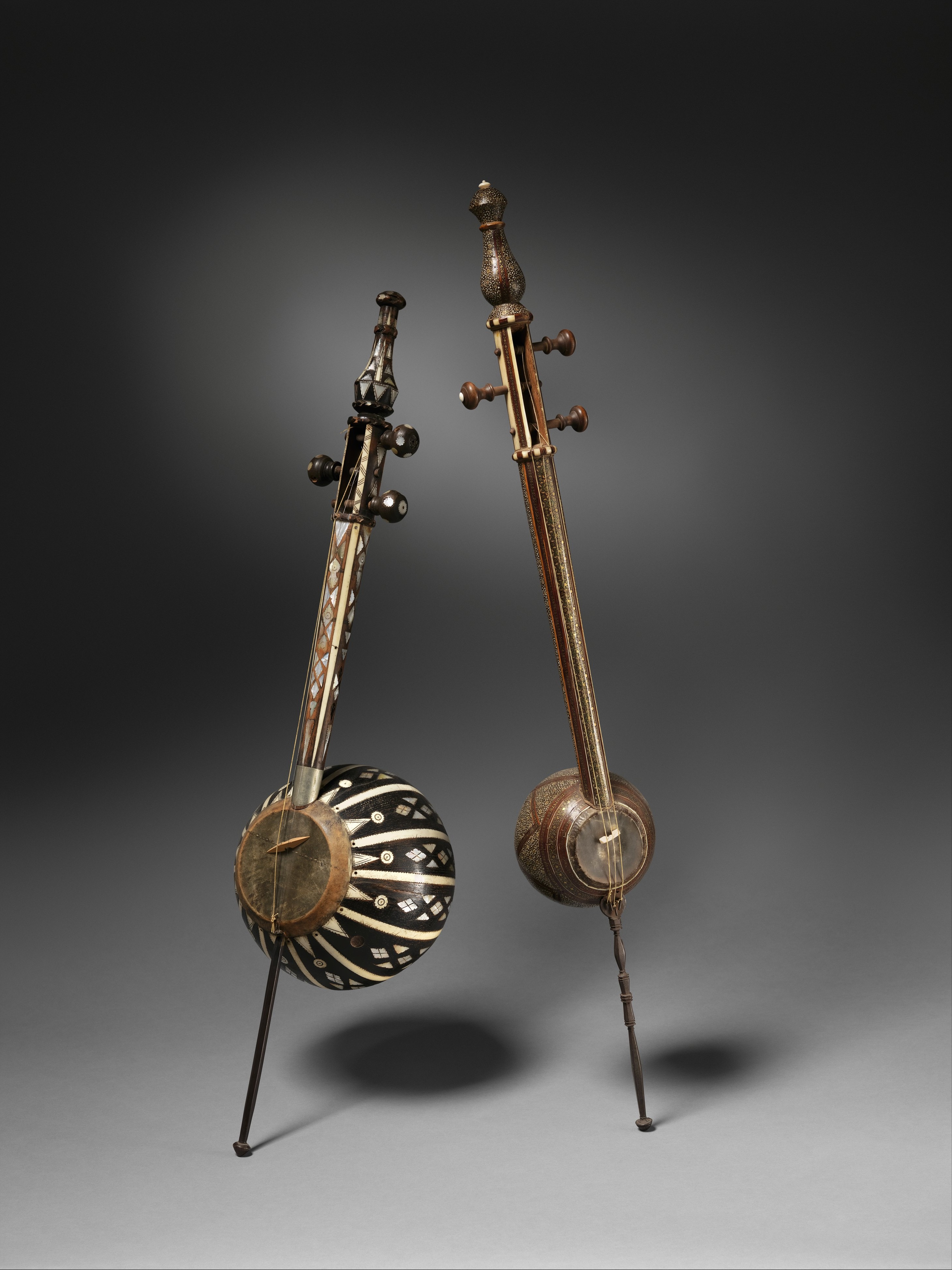
Kamancheh

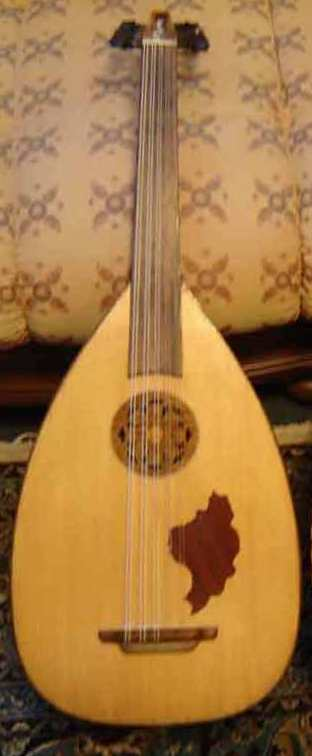
Oud (Barbat)

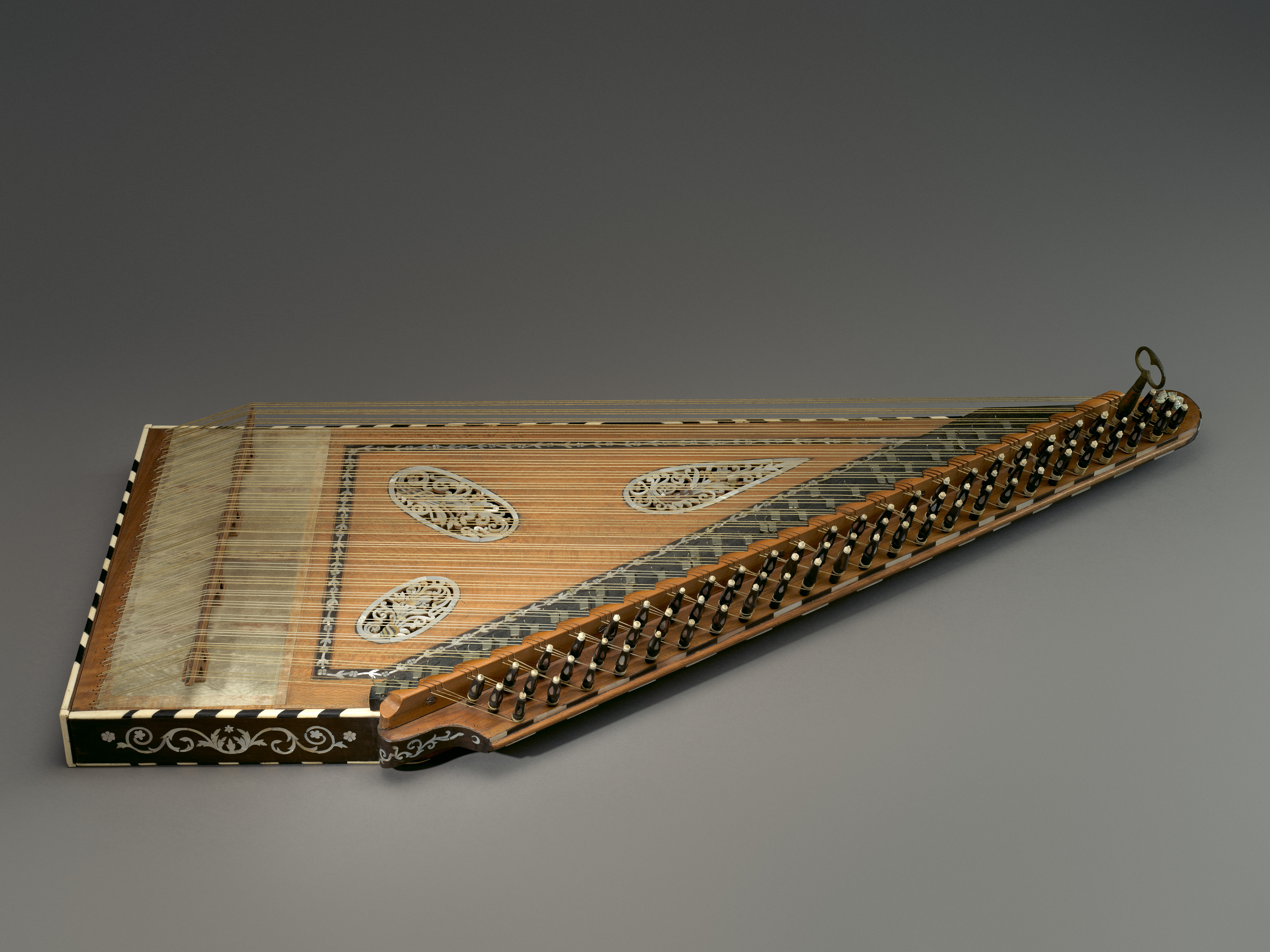
Qanun

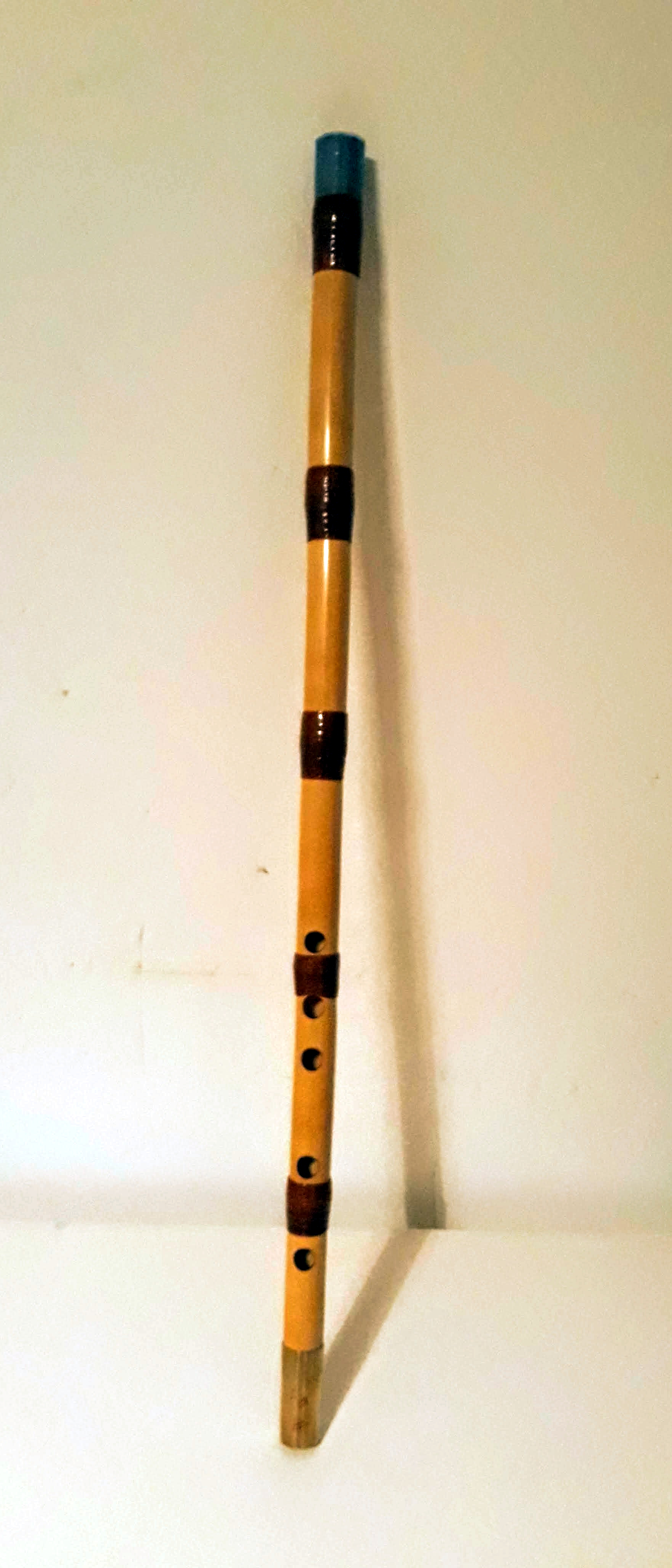
Ney

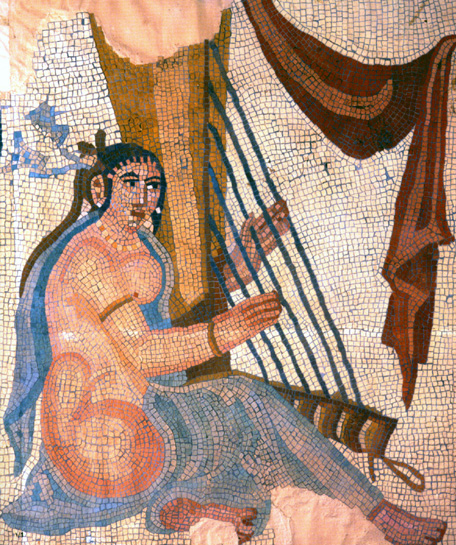
Chang

=== Handicrafts ===
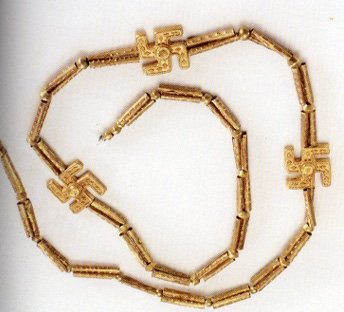
An ancient Iranian necklace featuring a swastika (known as "Mitra wheel"), discovered in Kelardasht, Gilan, dating to around 1000 BCE, National Museum of Iran.

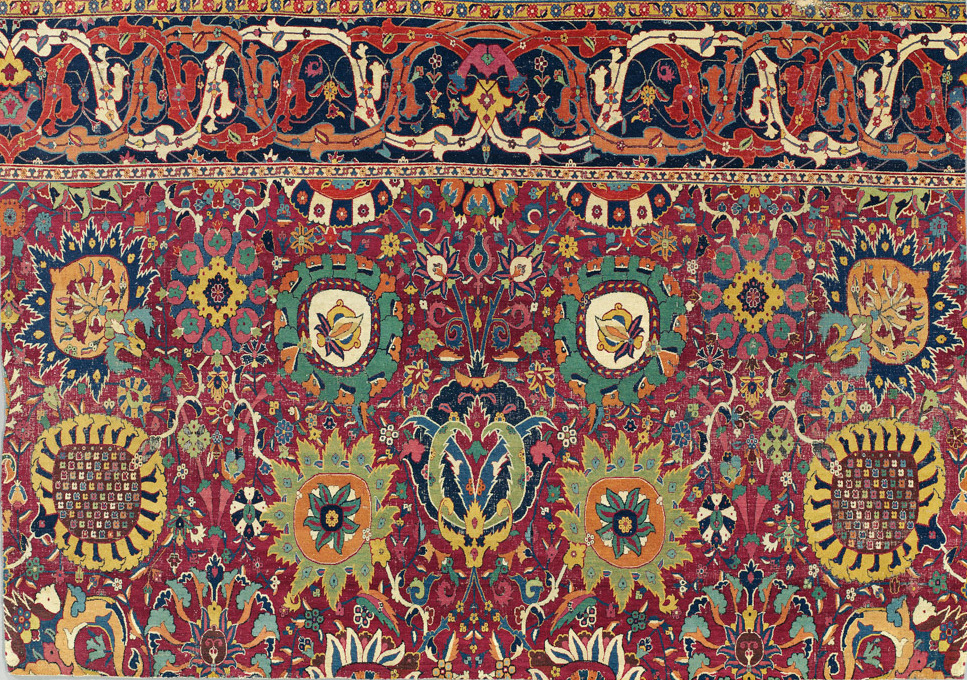
Persian carpet

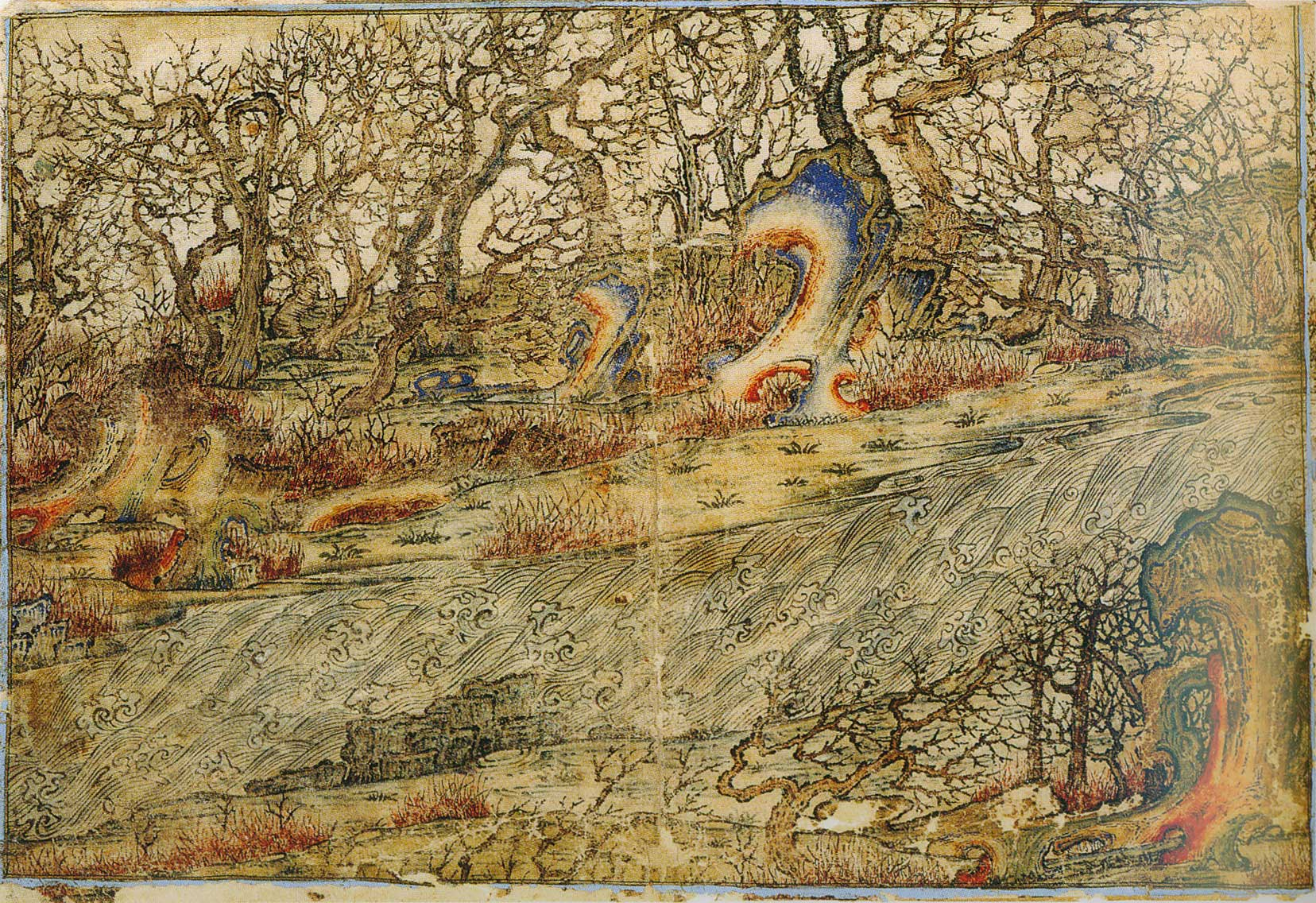
Persian miniature

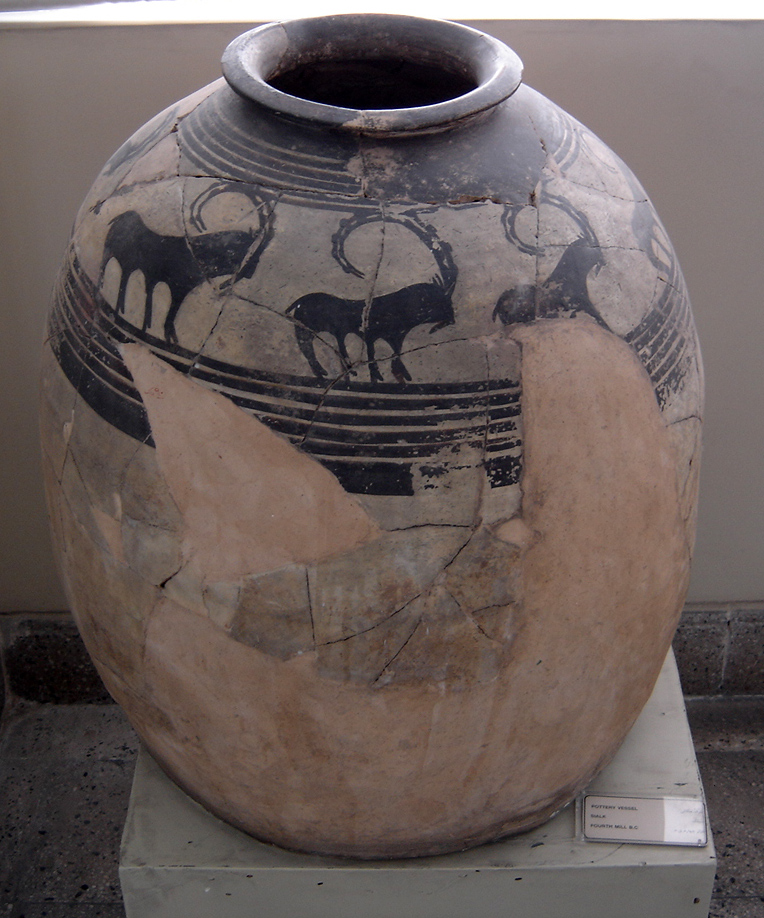
Iranian pottery

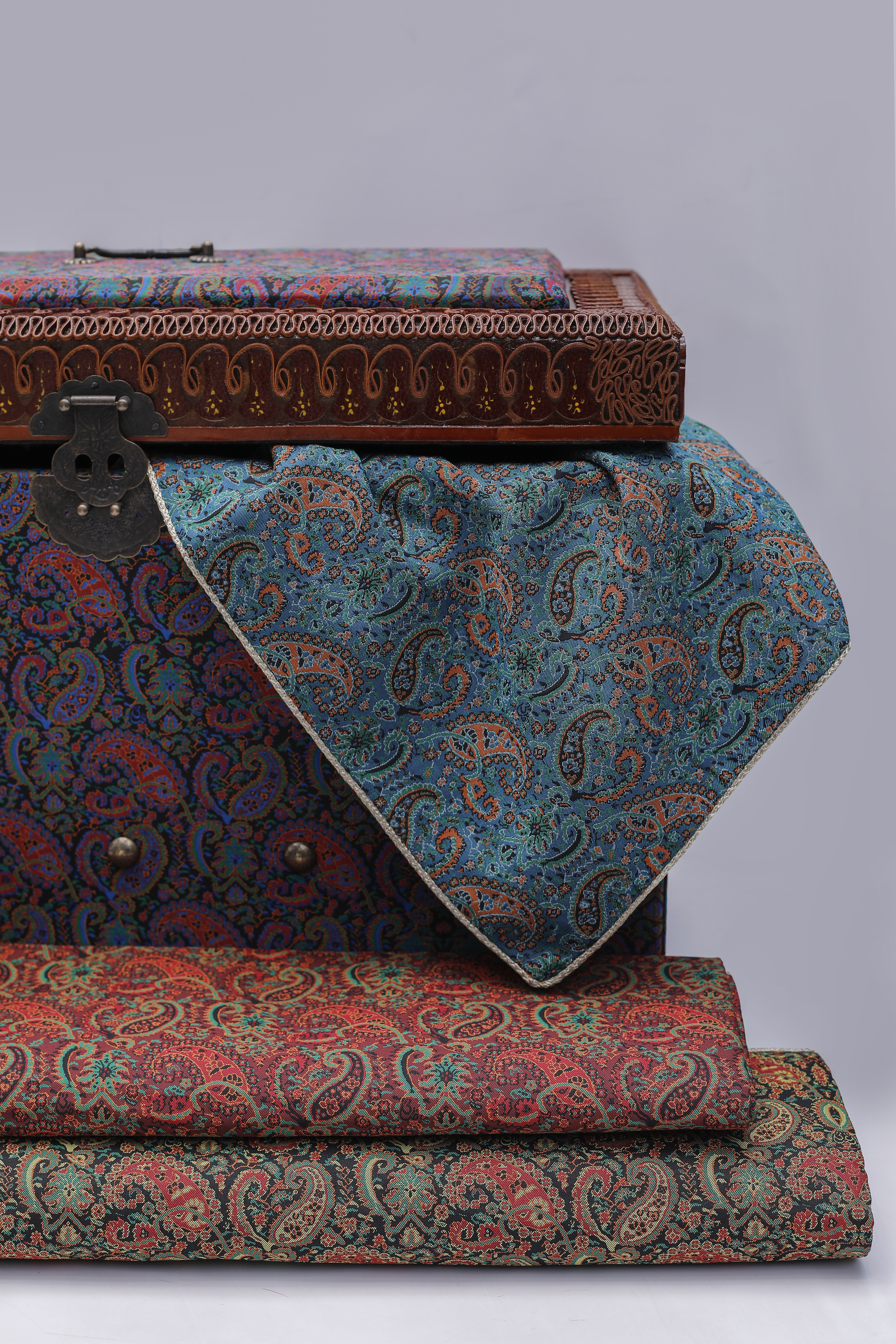
Termeh

=== Sports ===
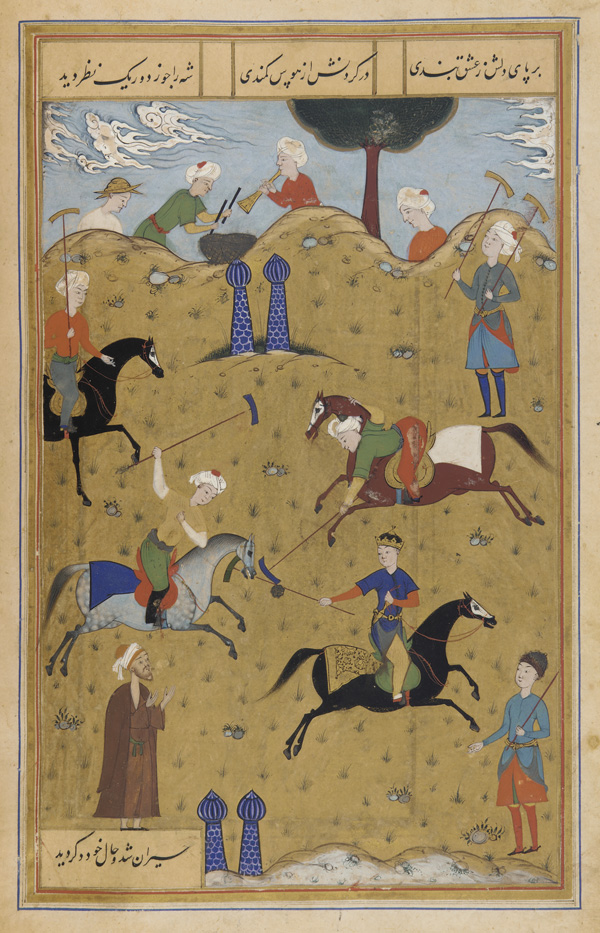
Polo (chogan)

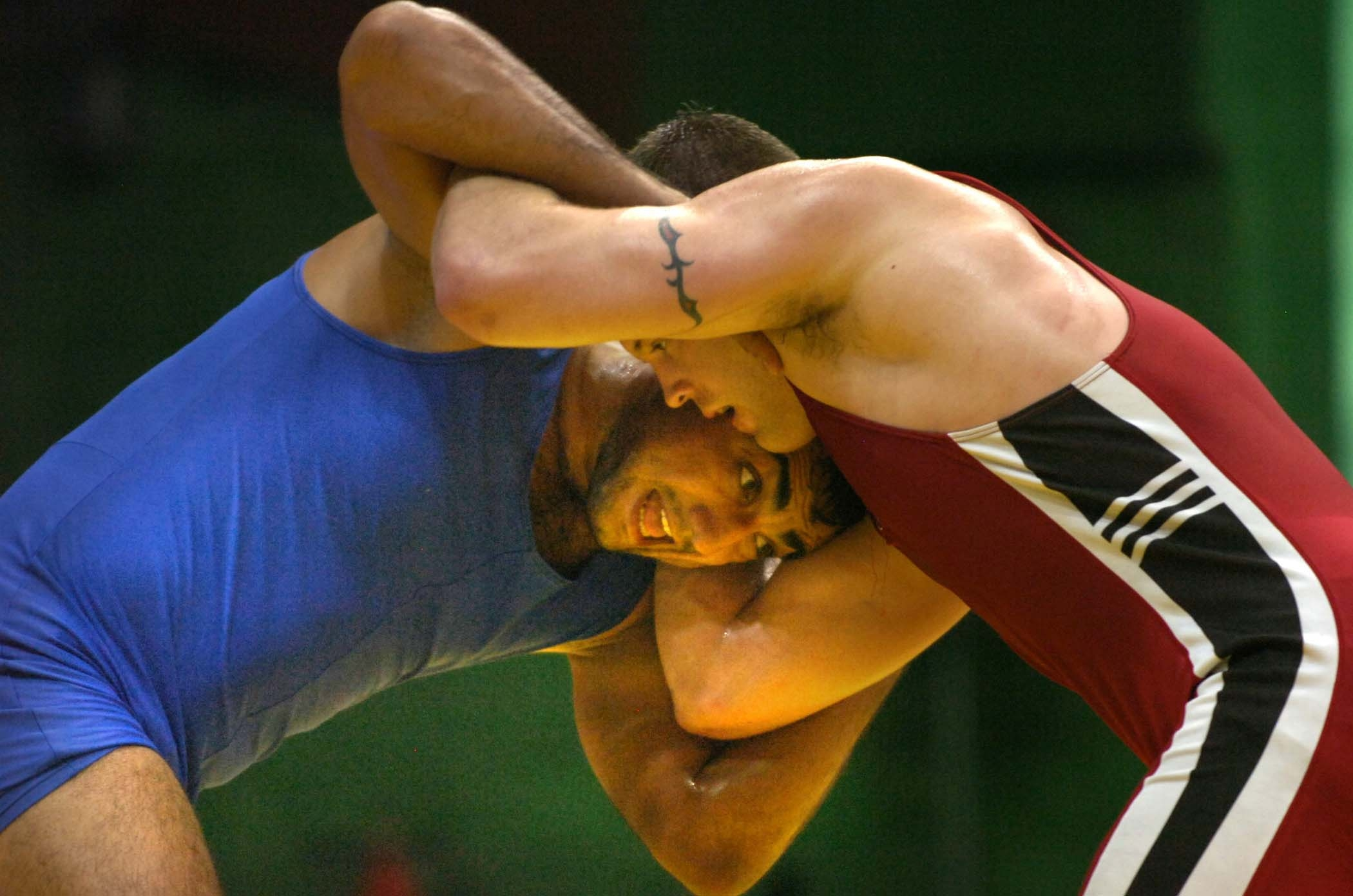
Wrestling (koshti)

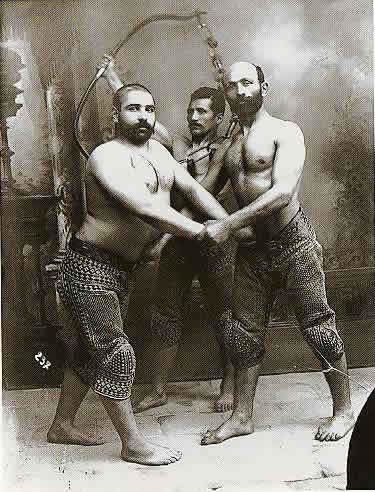
Varzesh-e bastani (zurkhaneh sport)

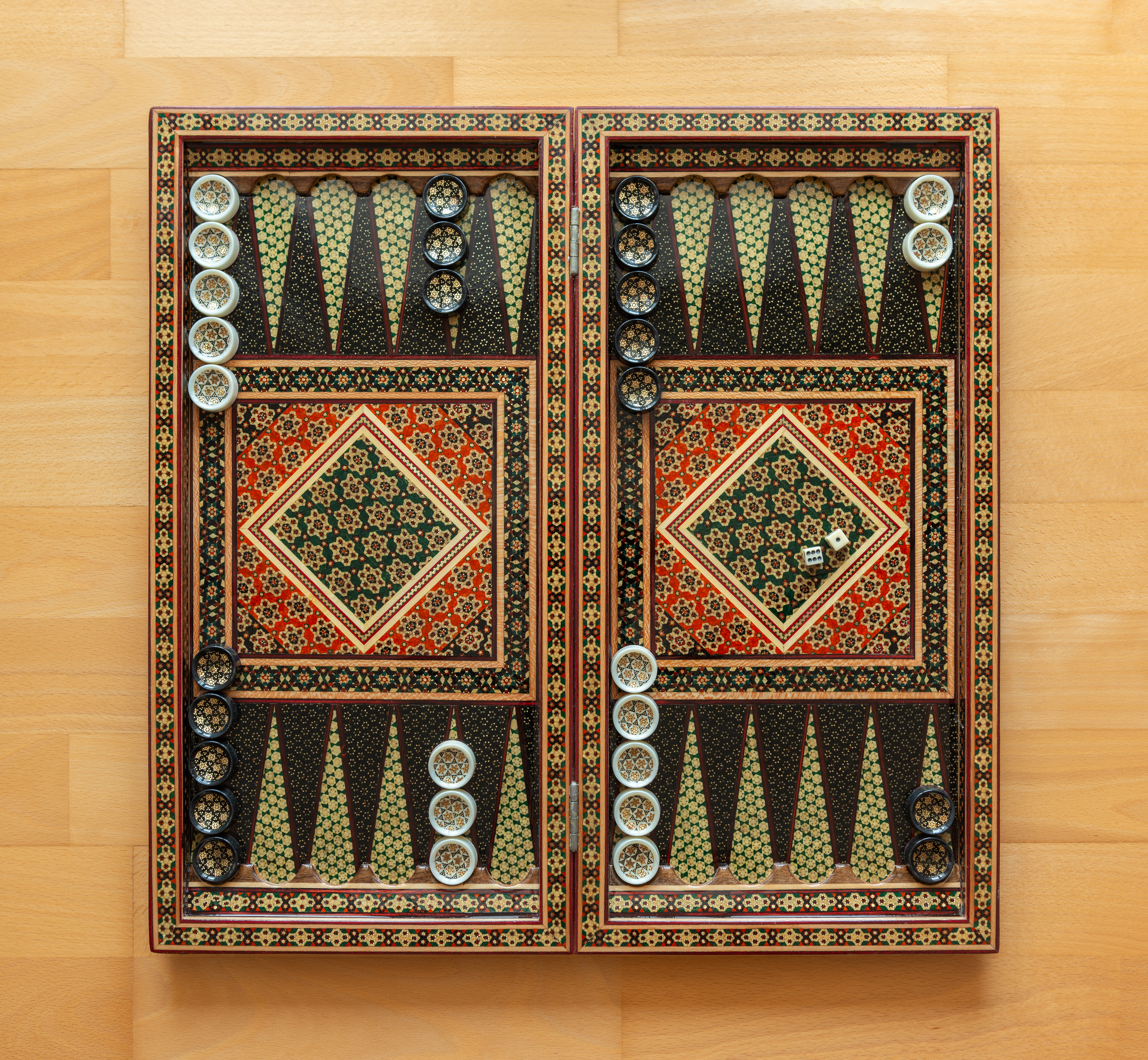
Backgammon

== Notable figures ==
=== Prophets ===
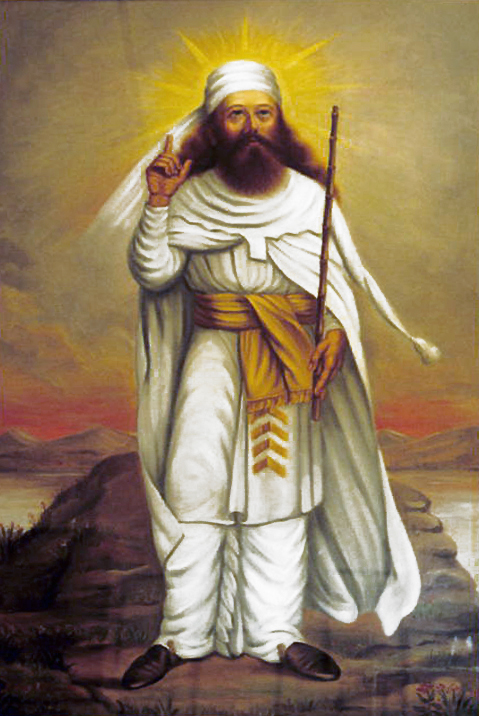
Zoroaster

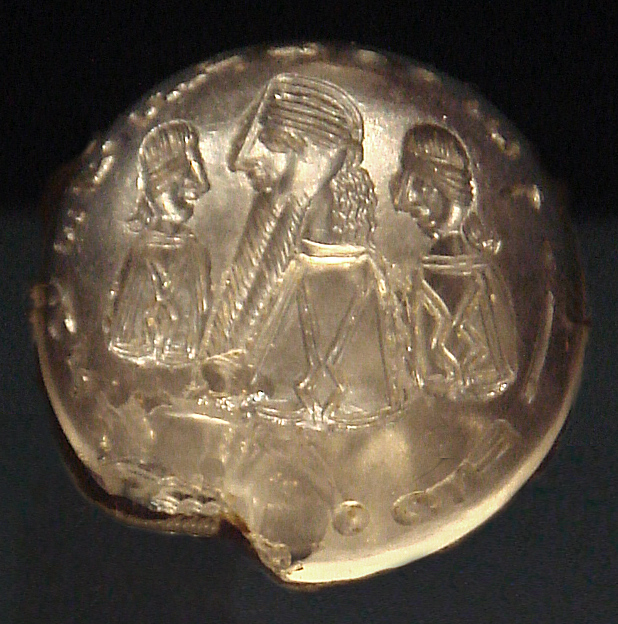
Mani

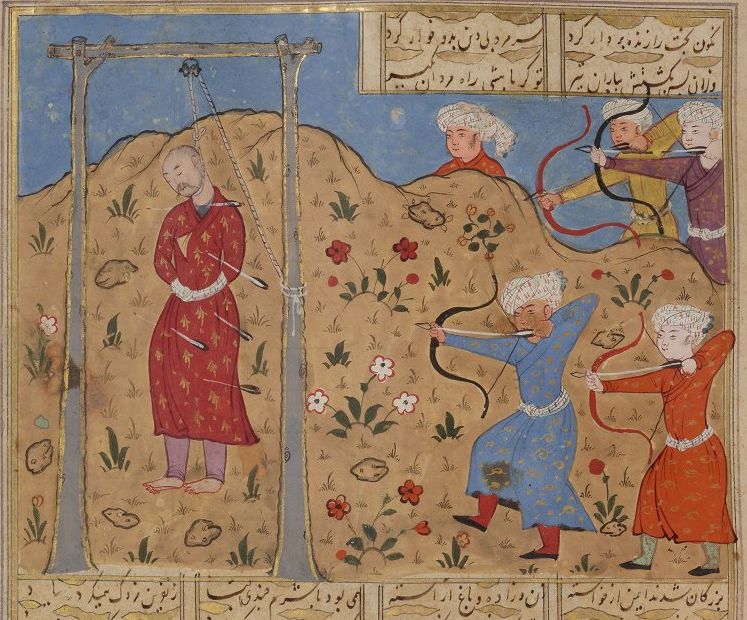
Mazdak

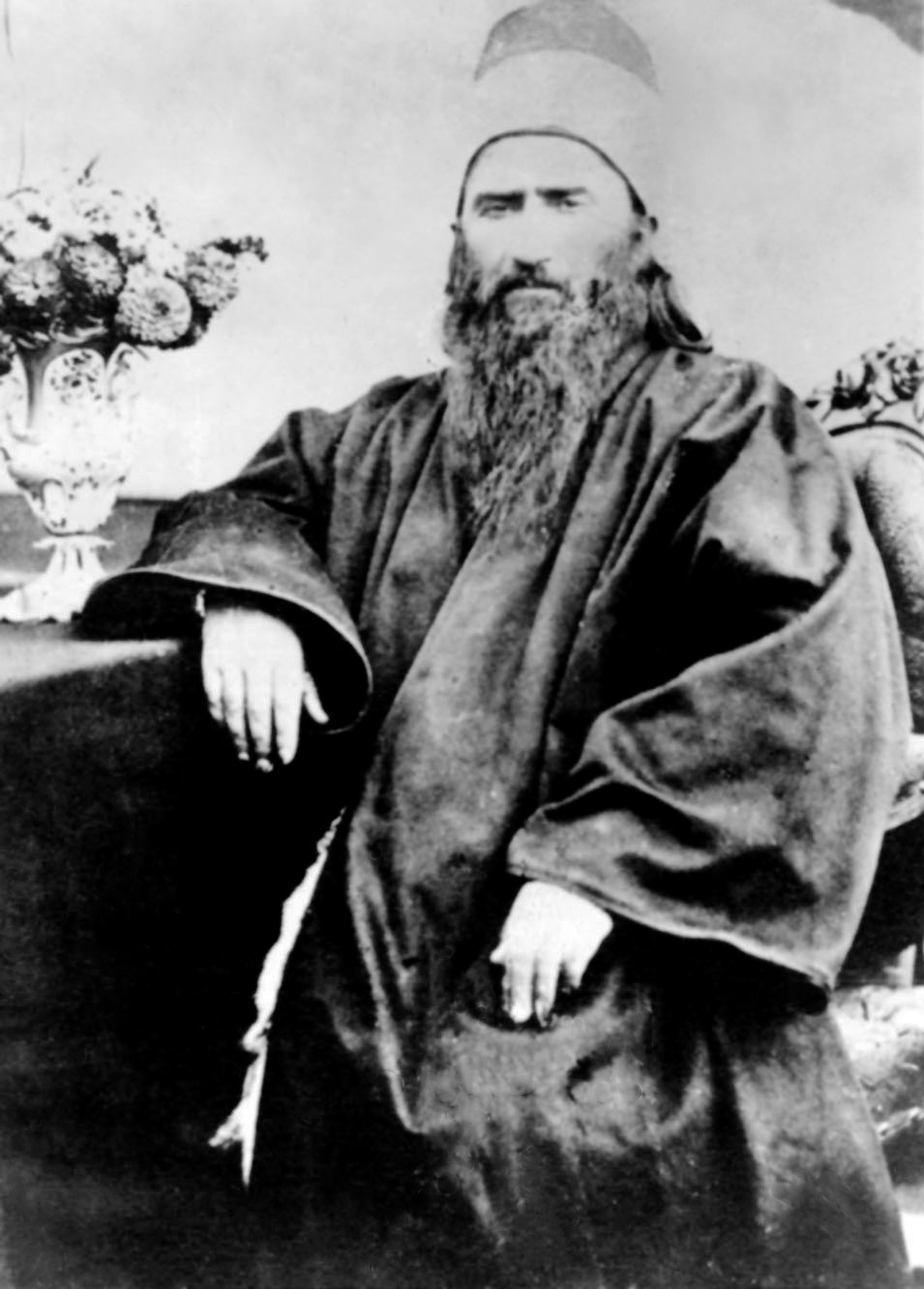
Bahá'u'lláh

=== Monarchs ===
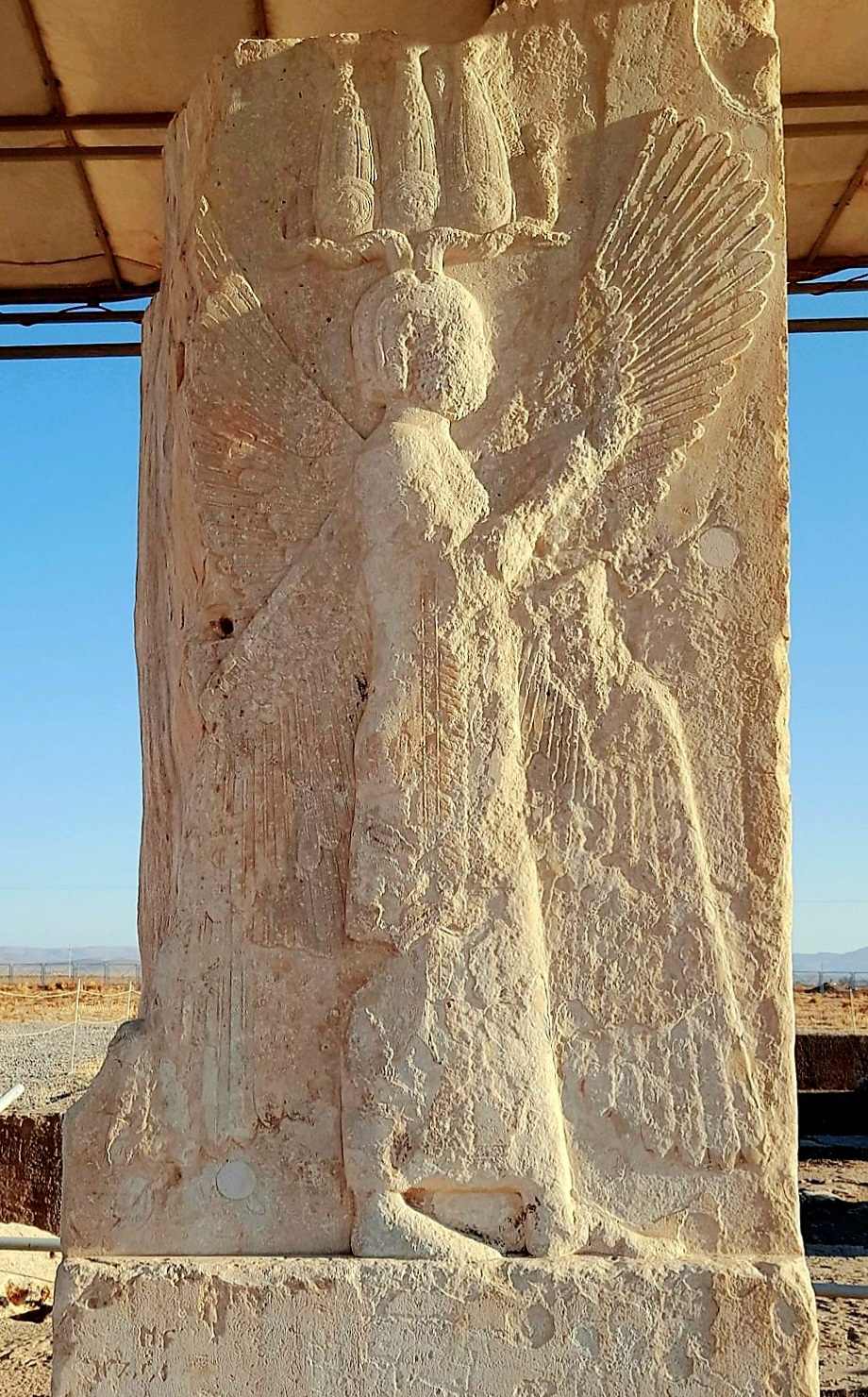
Cyrus the Great

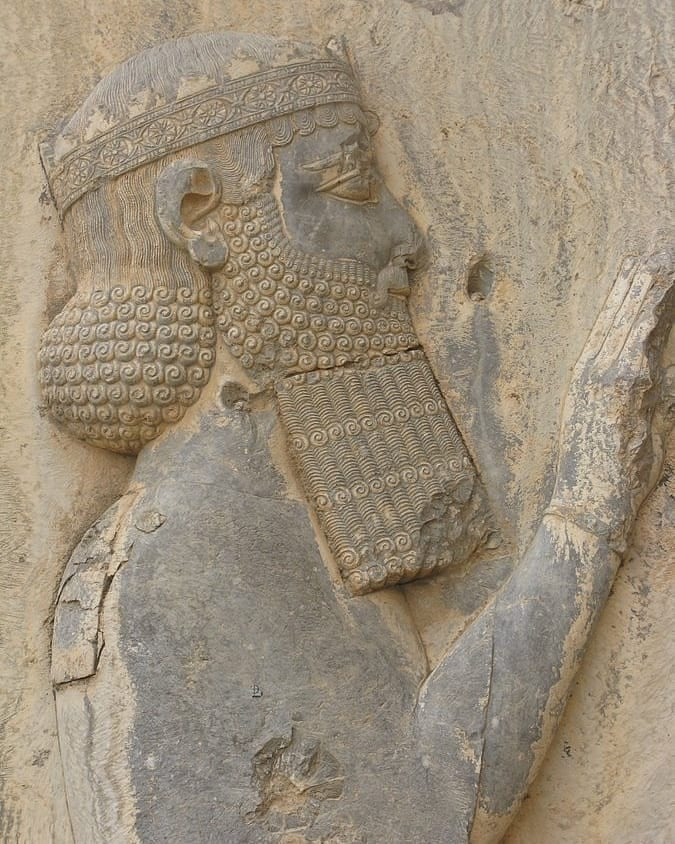
Darius the Great

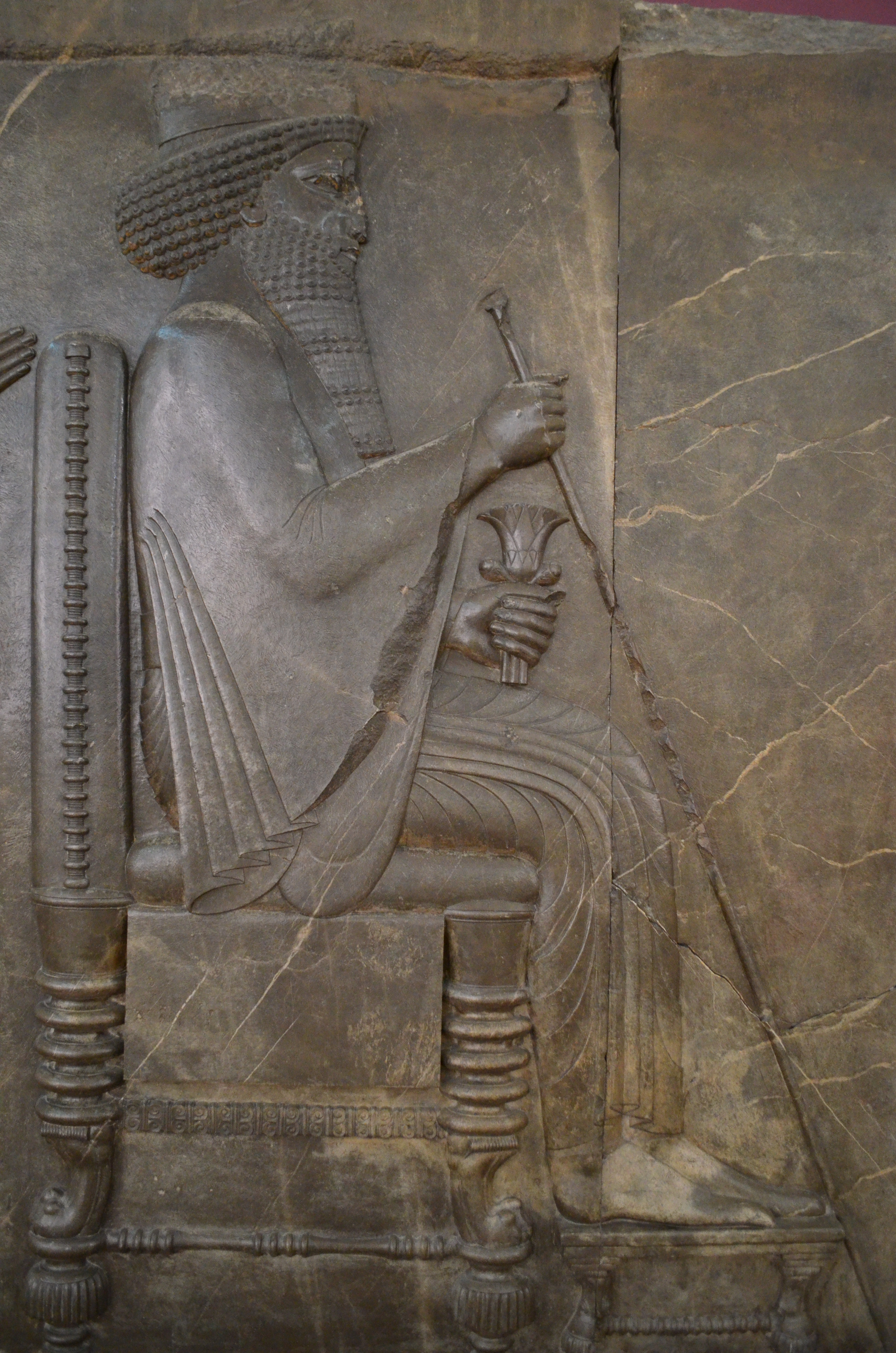
Xerxes the Great

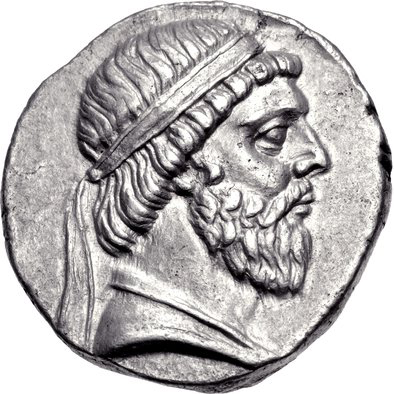
Mithridates I of Parthia

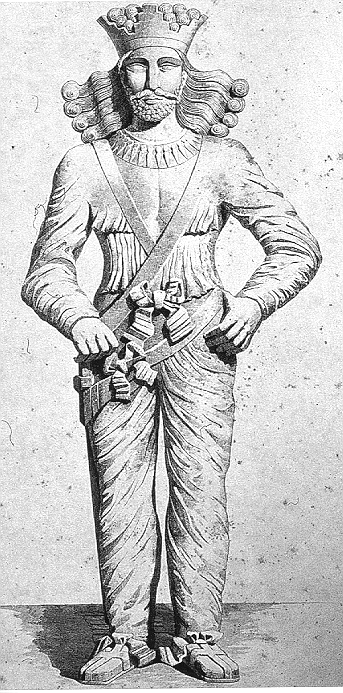
Shapur I

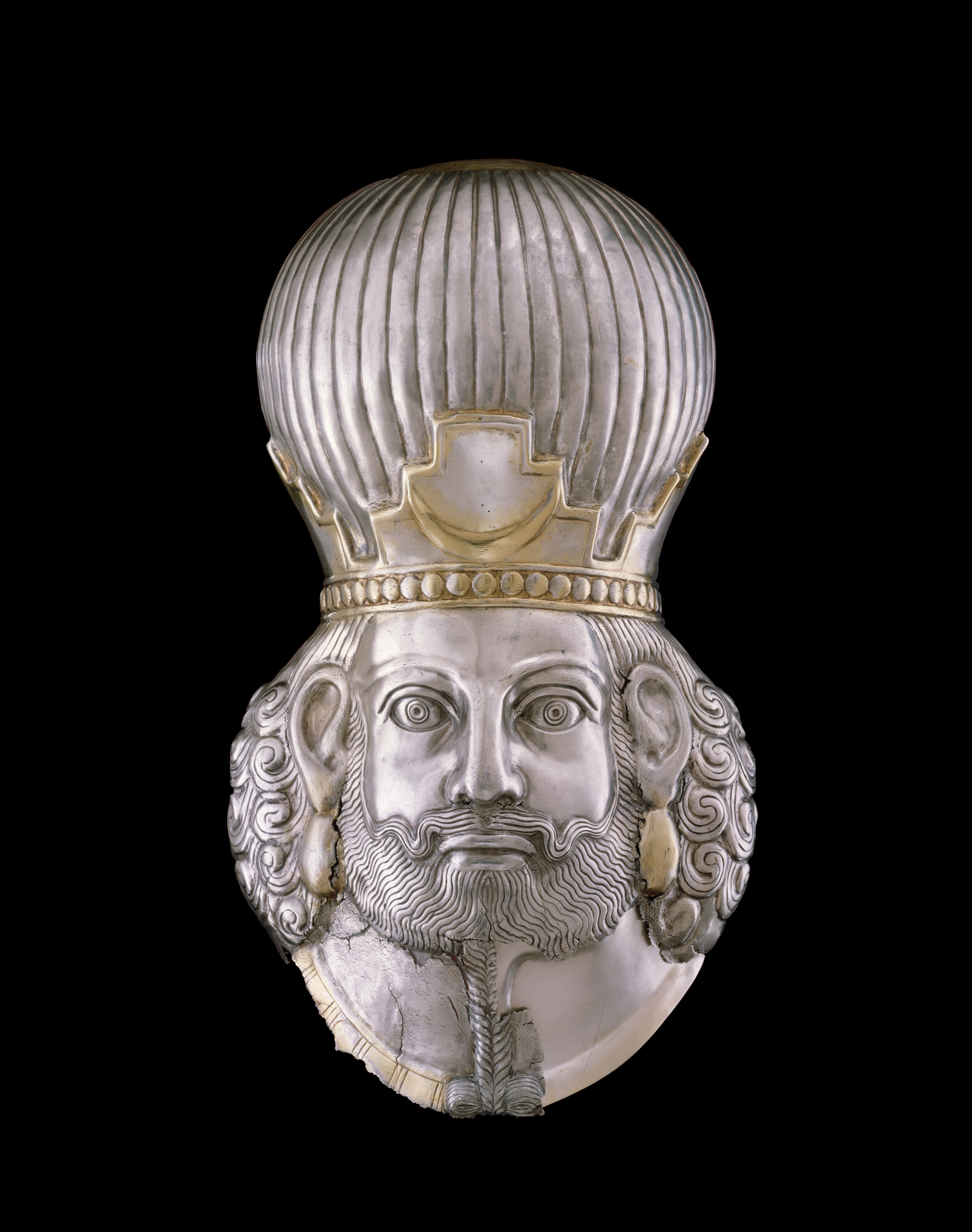
Shapur the Great

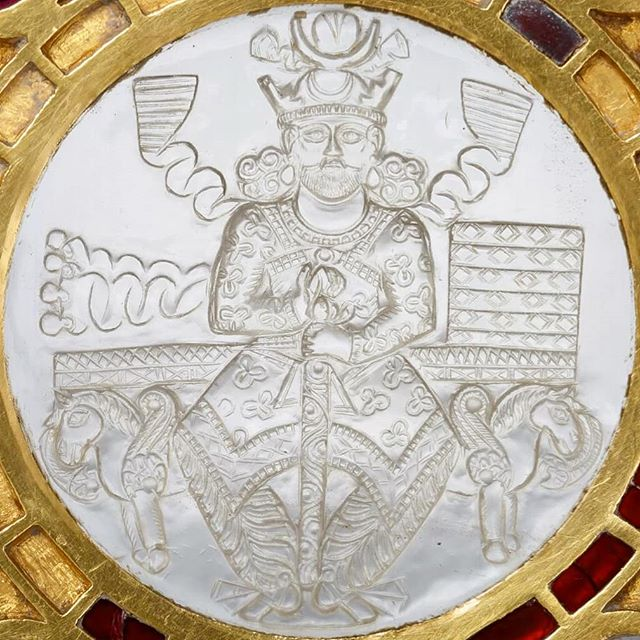
Khosrow I

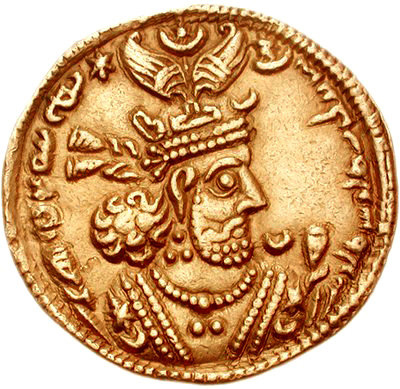
Khosrow II

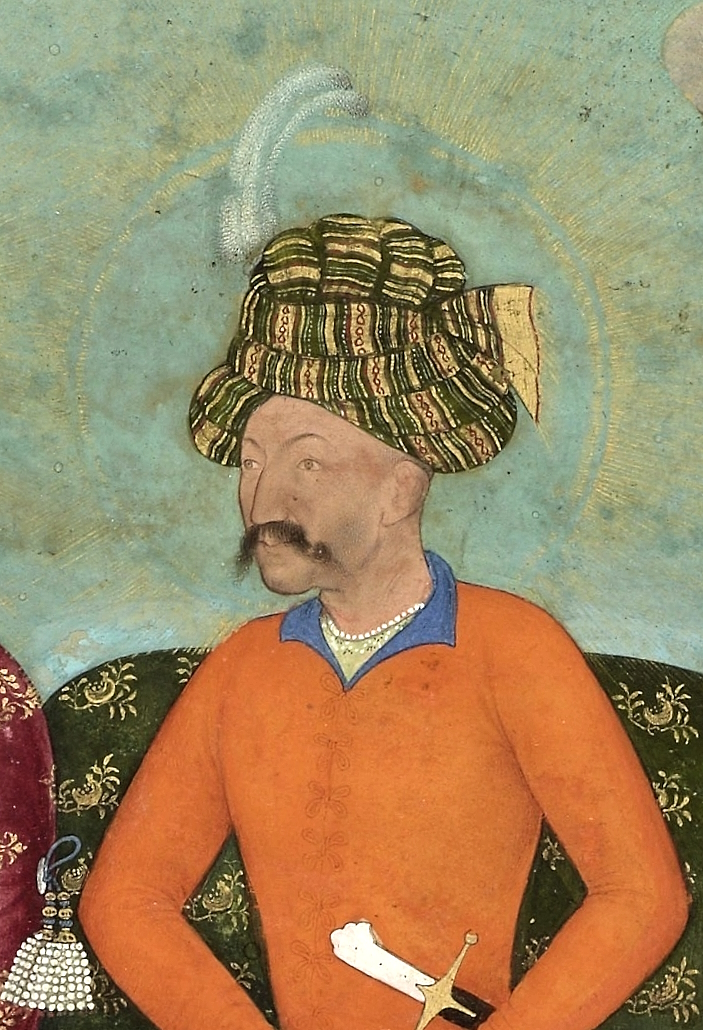
Abbas the Great

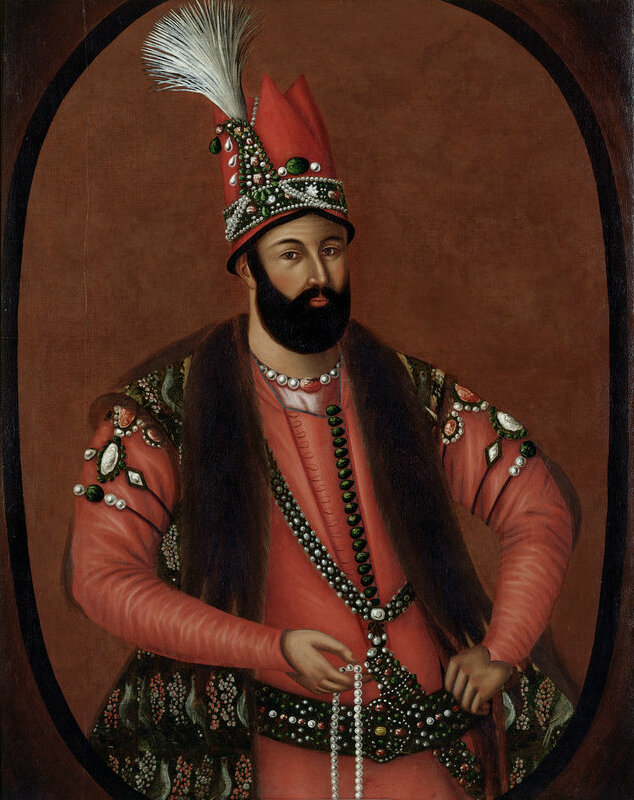
Nader Shah

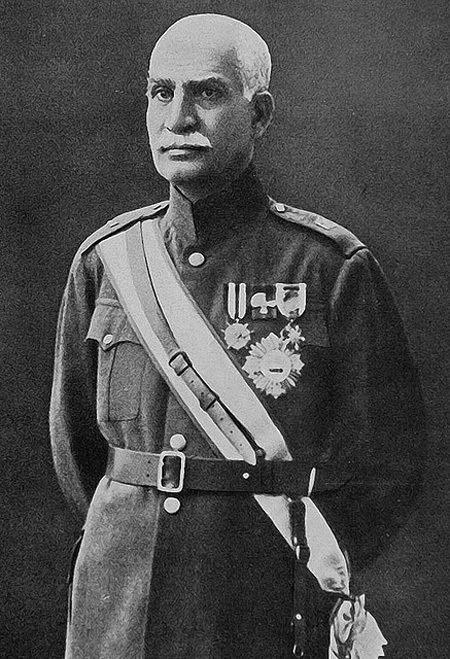
Reza Shah

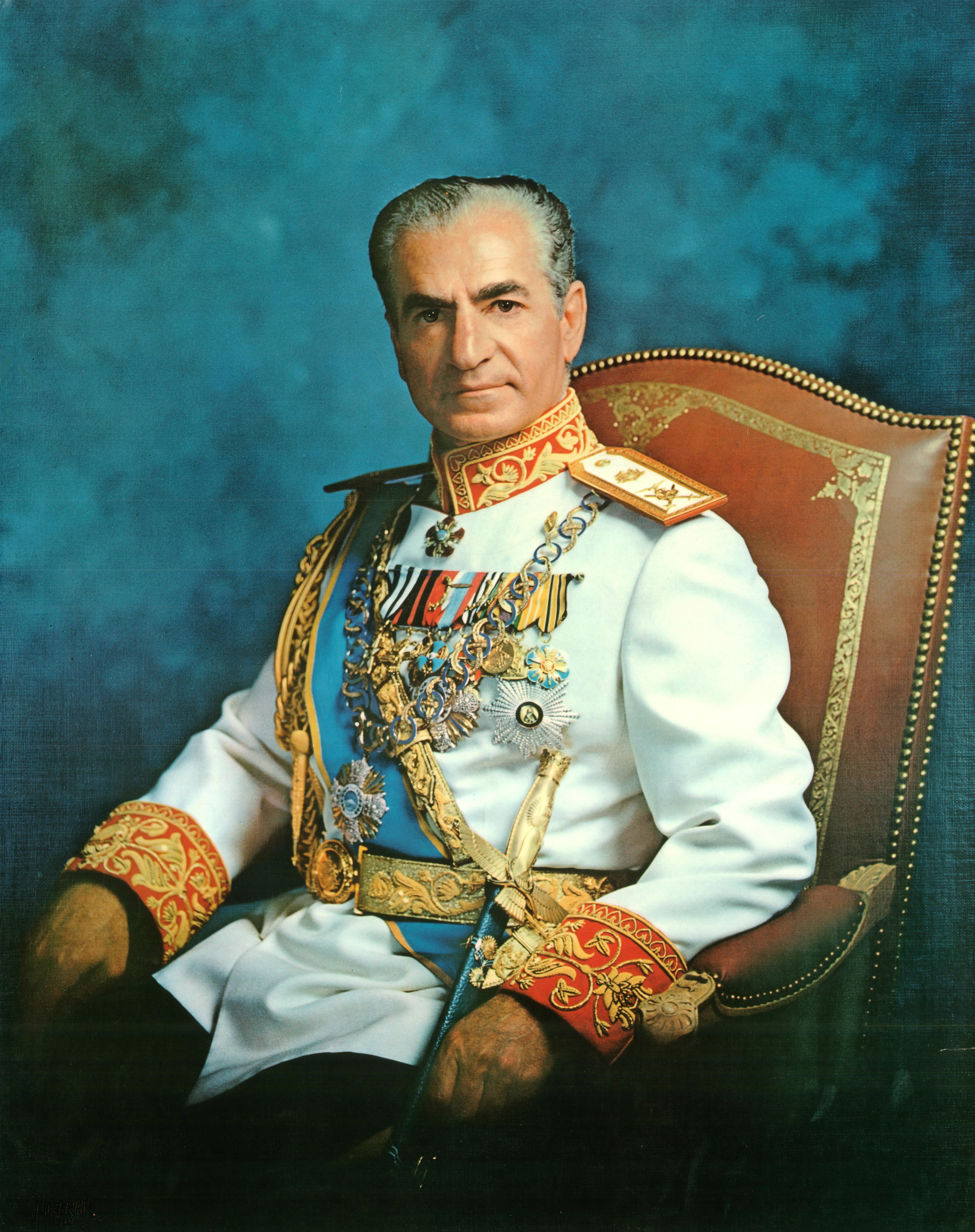
Mohammad Reza Shah

=== Poets ===
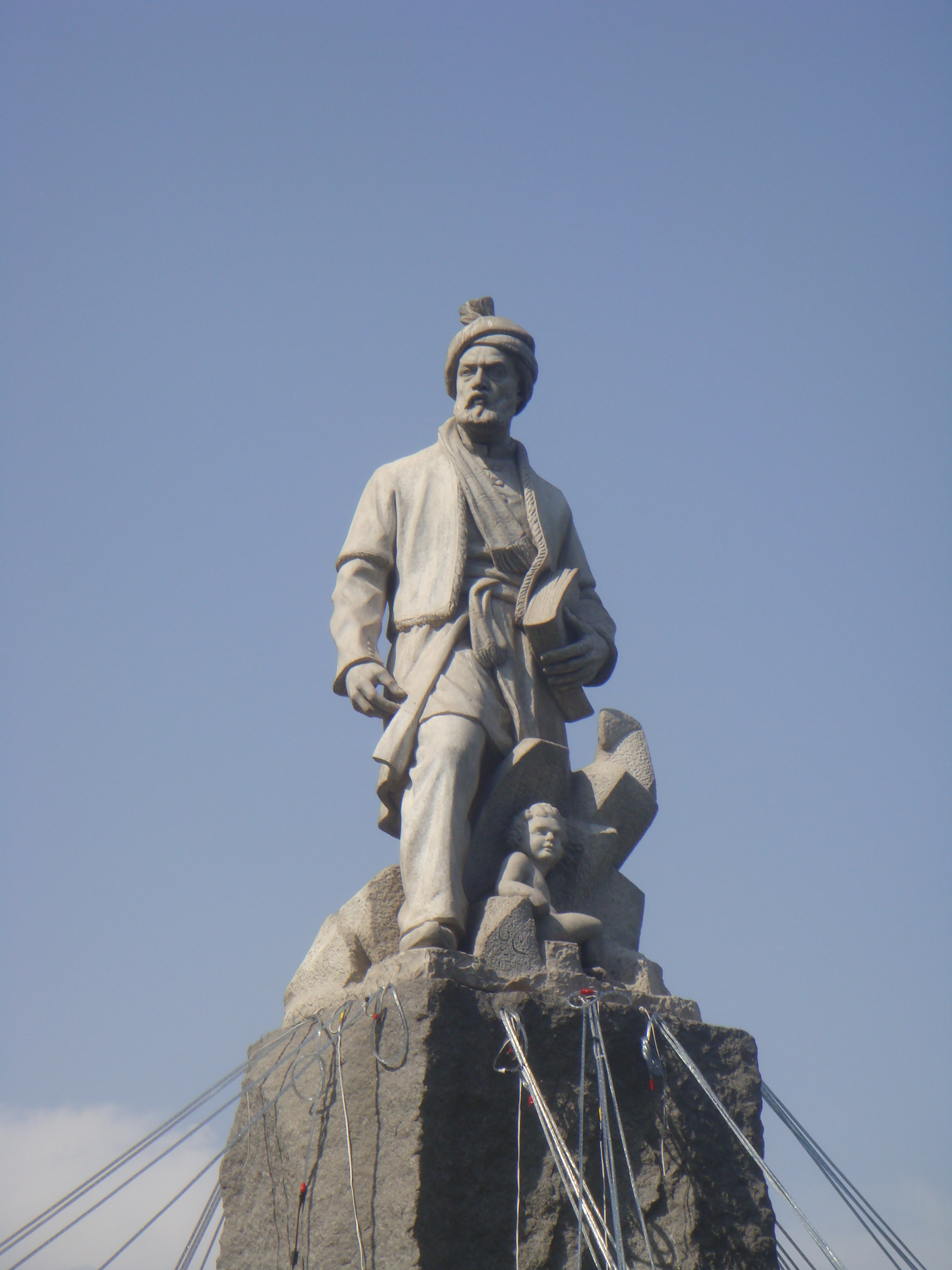
Ferdowsi

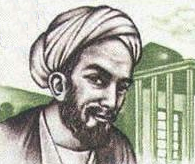
Saadi

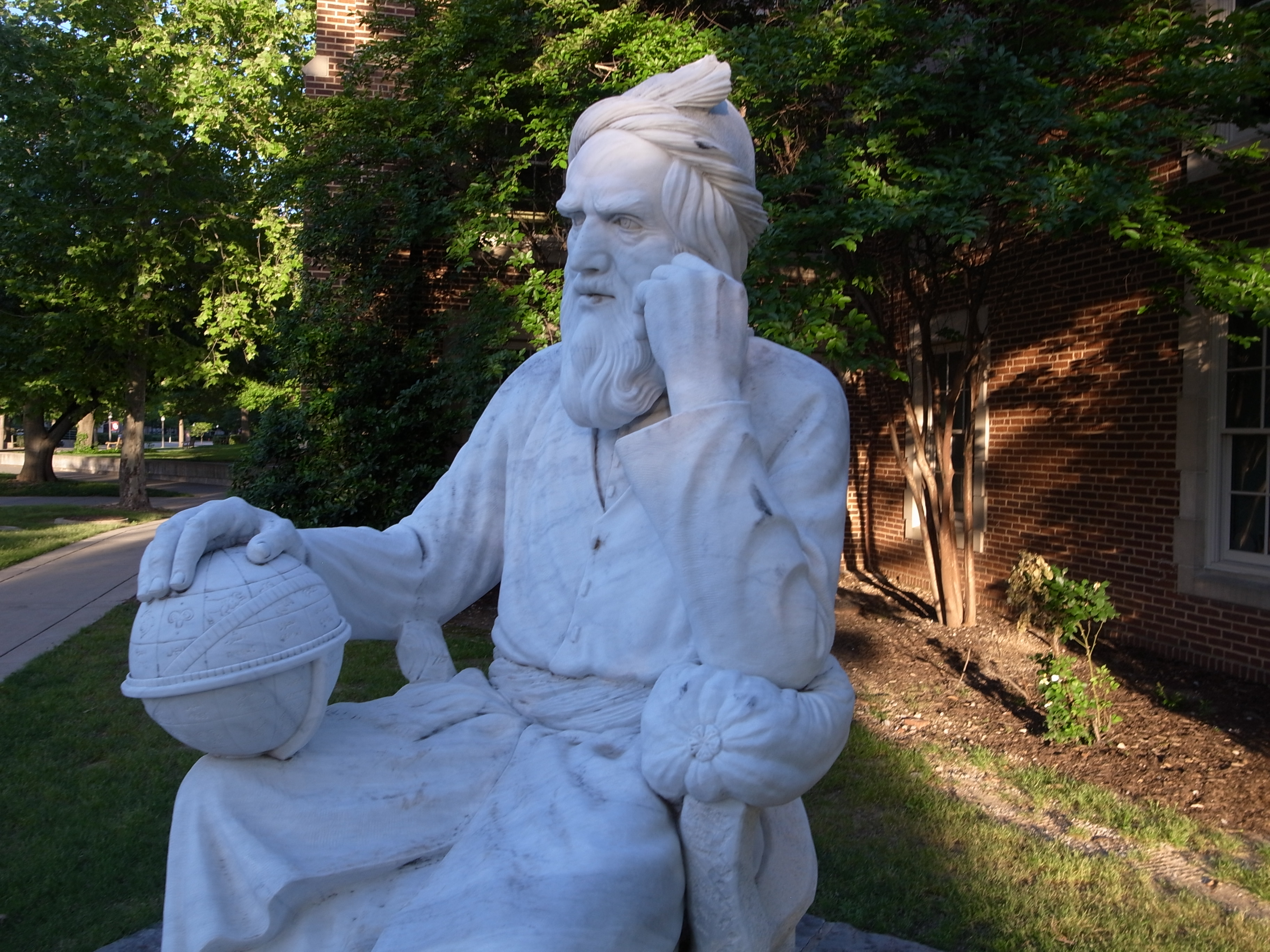
Omar Khayyam

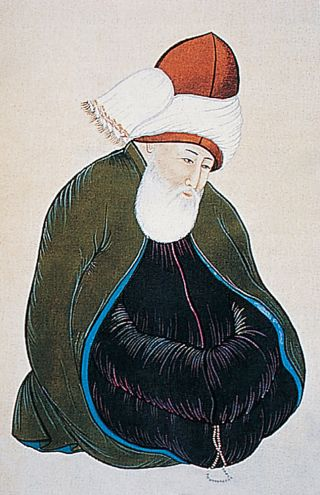
Rumi

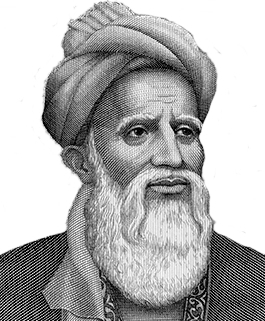
Rudaki

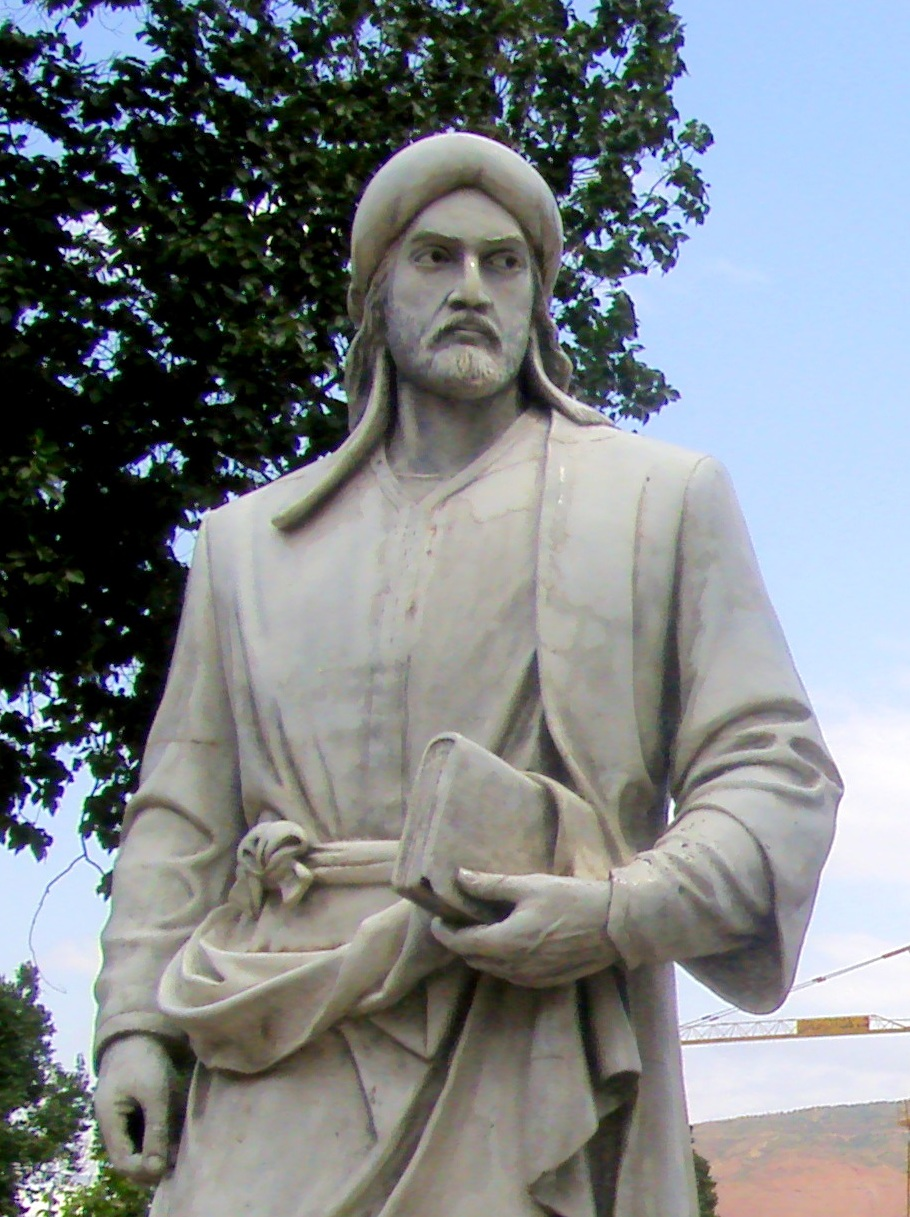
Khaqani

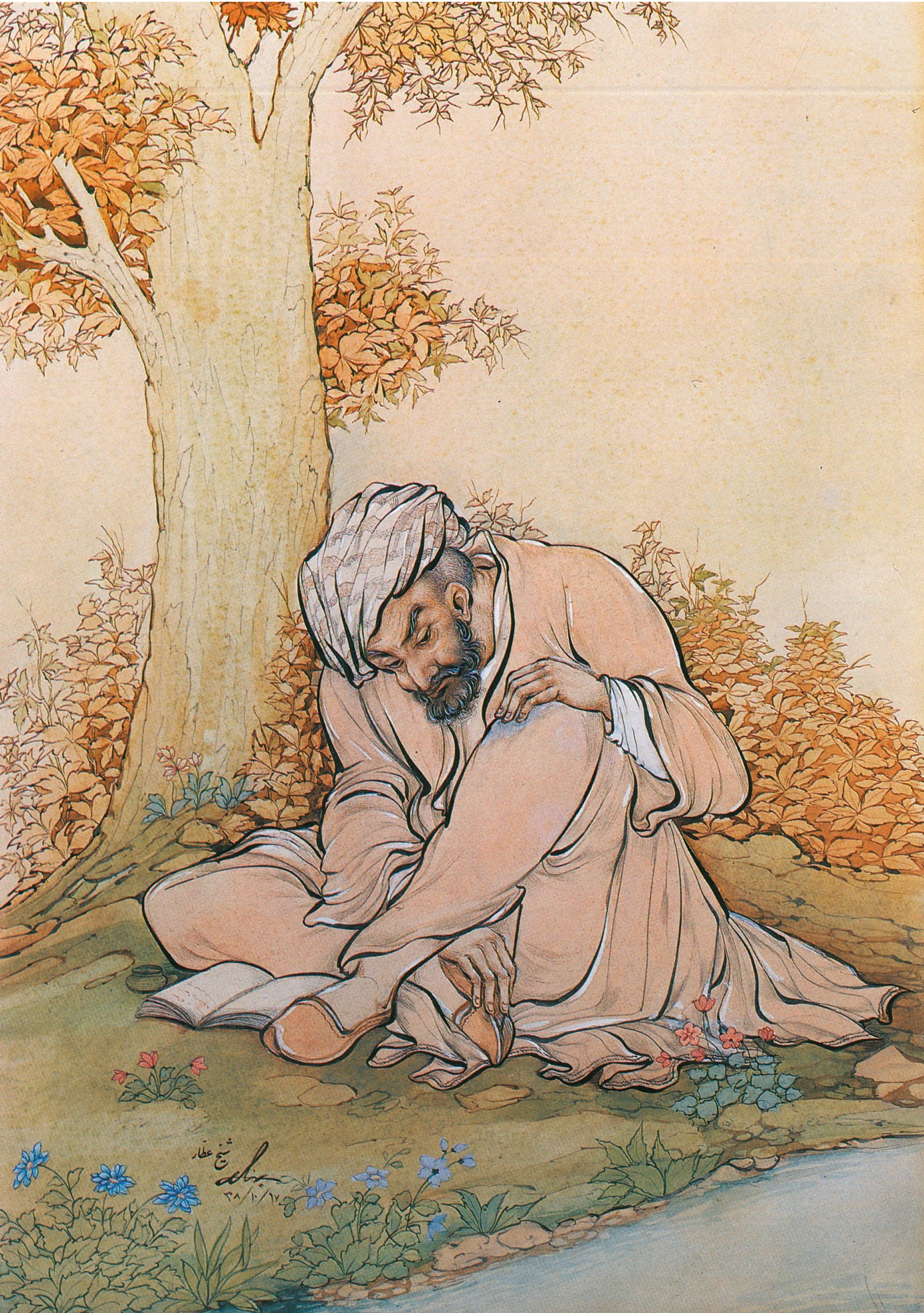
Attar of Nishapur

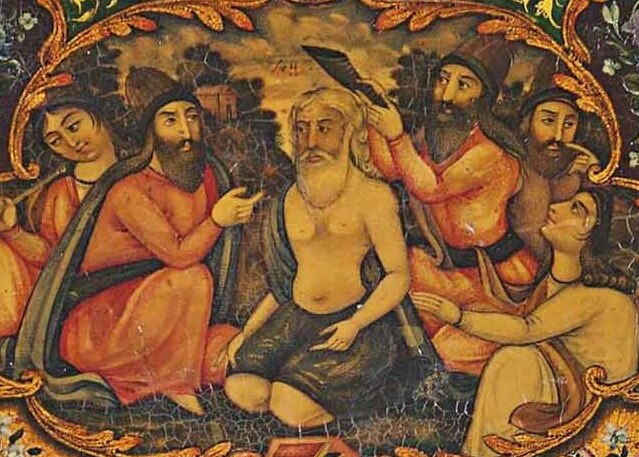
Baba Tahir

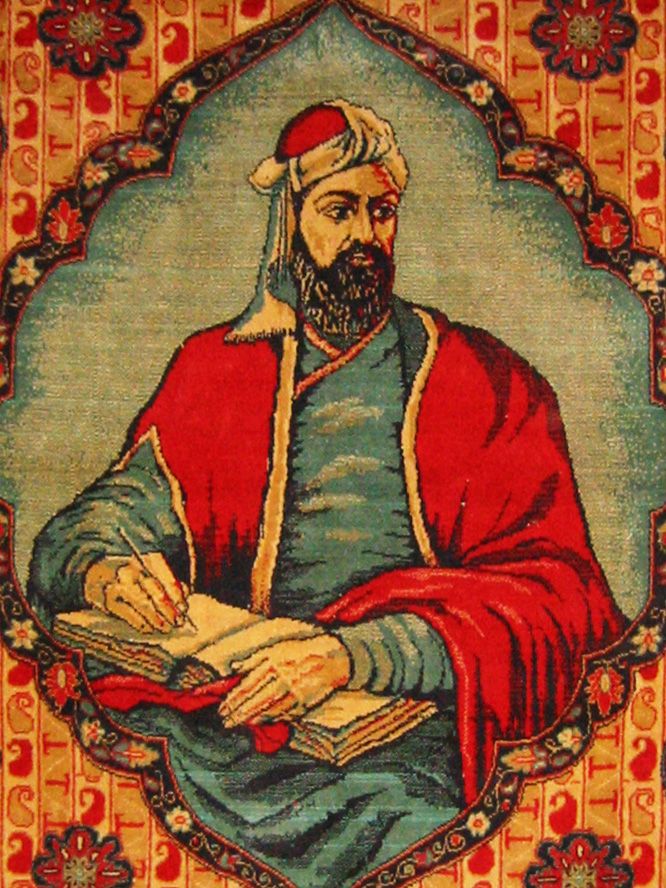
Nizami Ganjavi

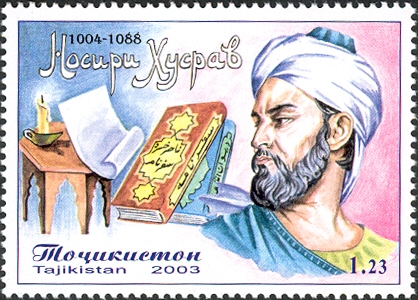
Nasir Khusraw

=== Scholars ===
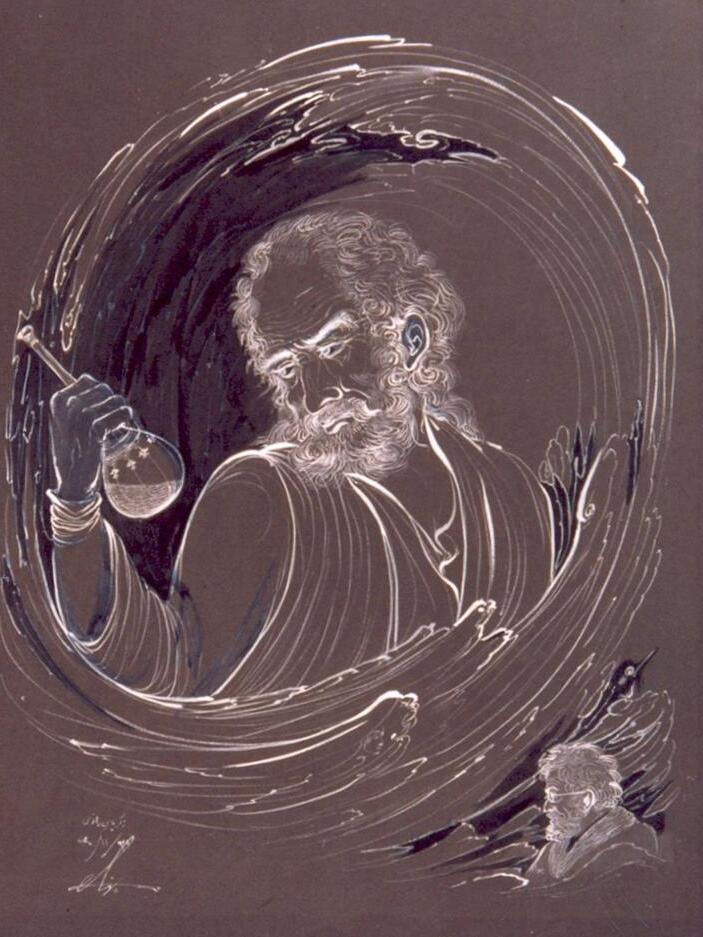
Abu Bakr al-Razi (Zakariyyā-ye Rāzi)

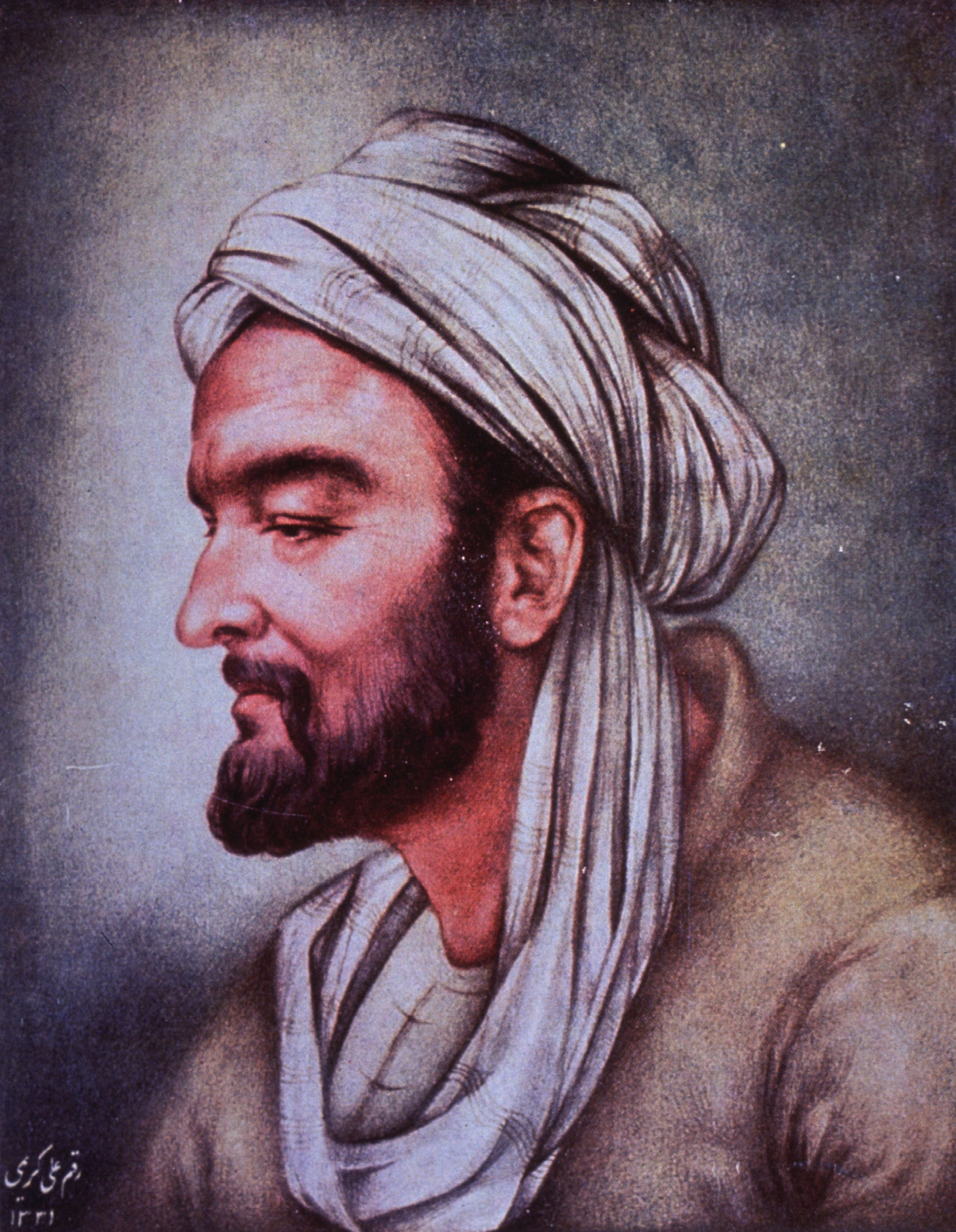
Avicenna (Ibn Sina)

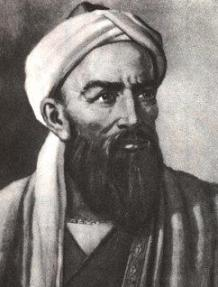
Al-Biruni

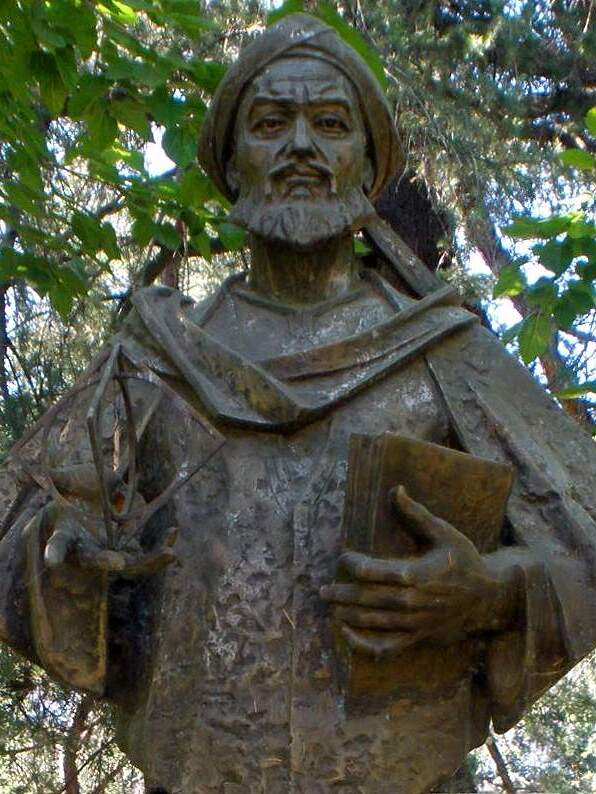
Al-Khwarizmi

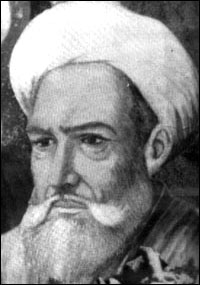
Al-Farabi

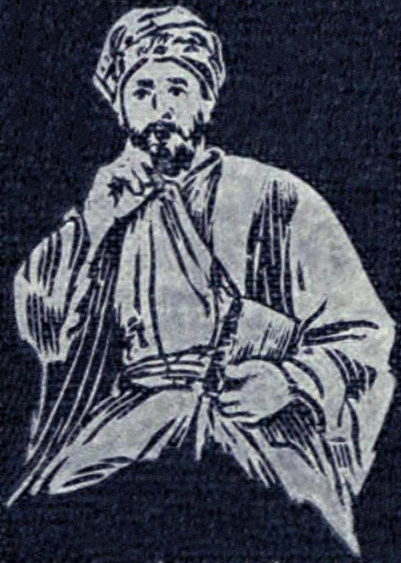
Al-Ghazali

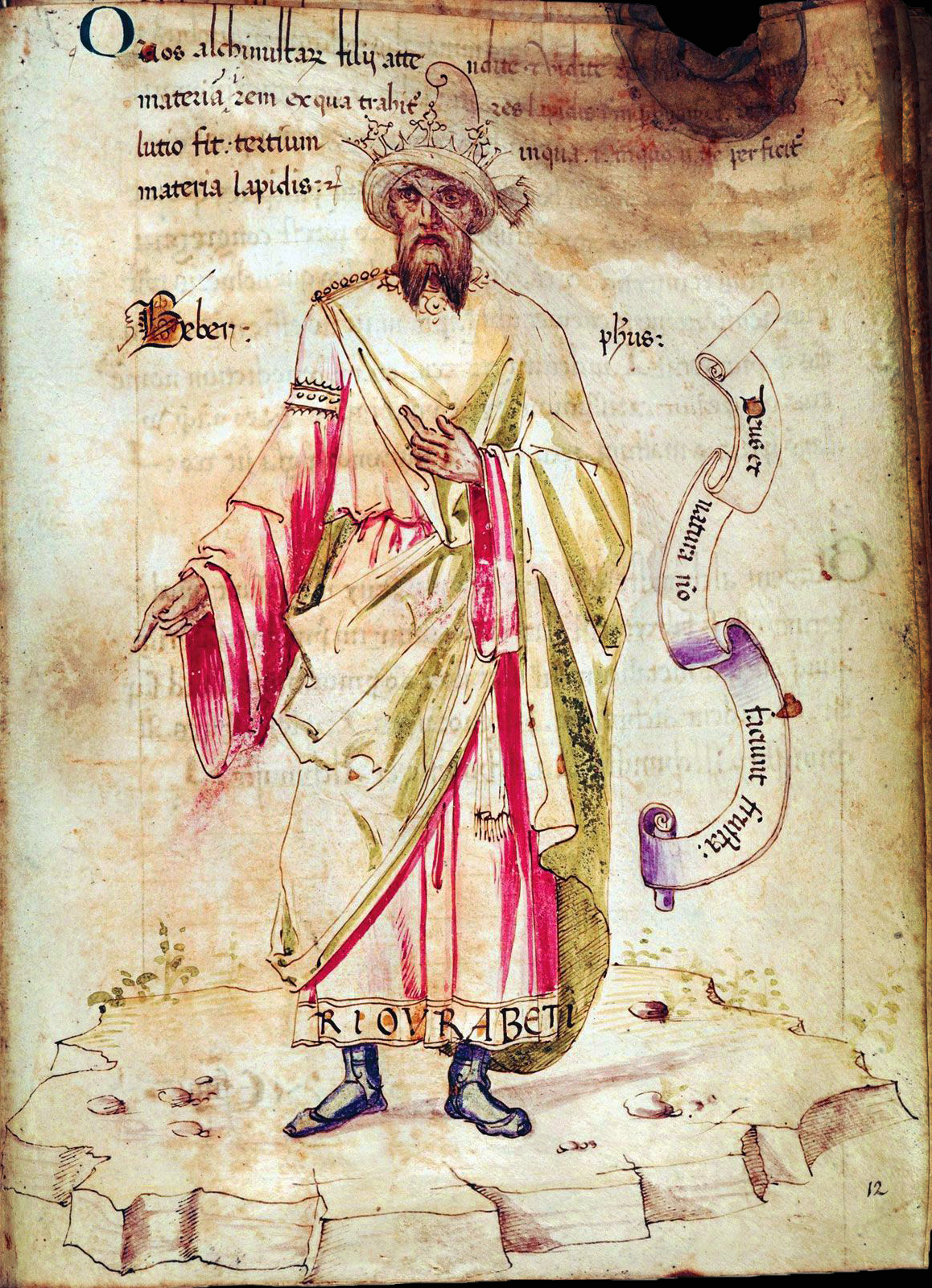
Jabir ibn Hayyan

=== Mythological ===
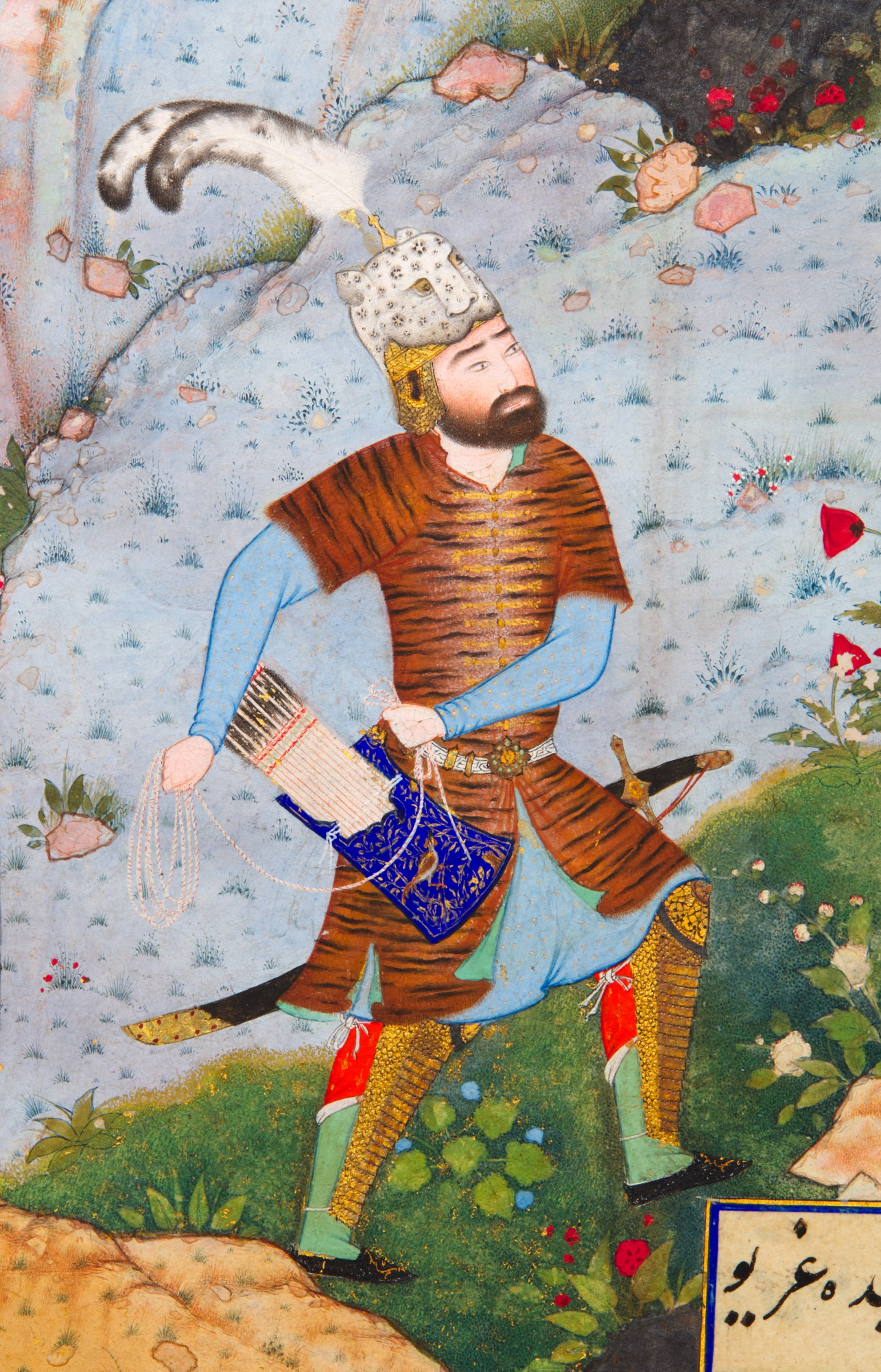
Rostam

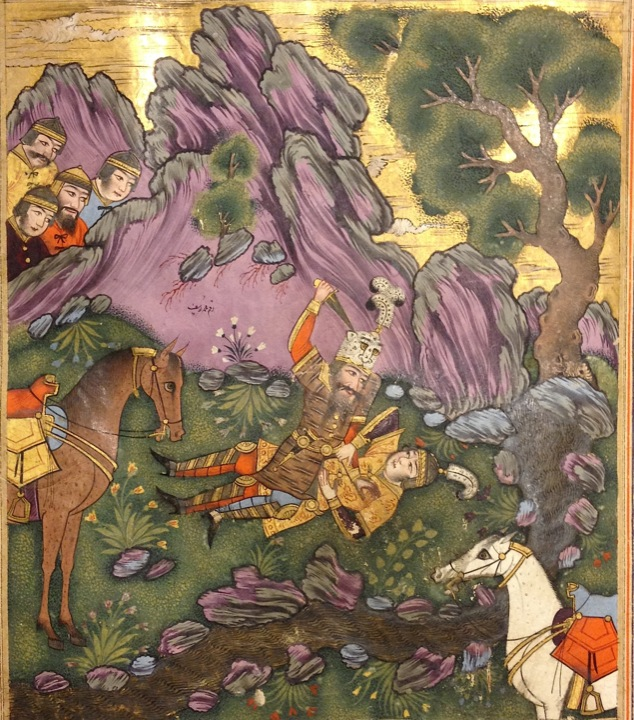
Sohrab

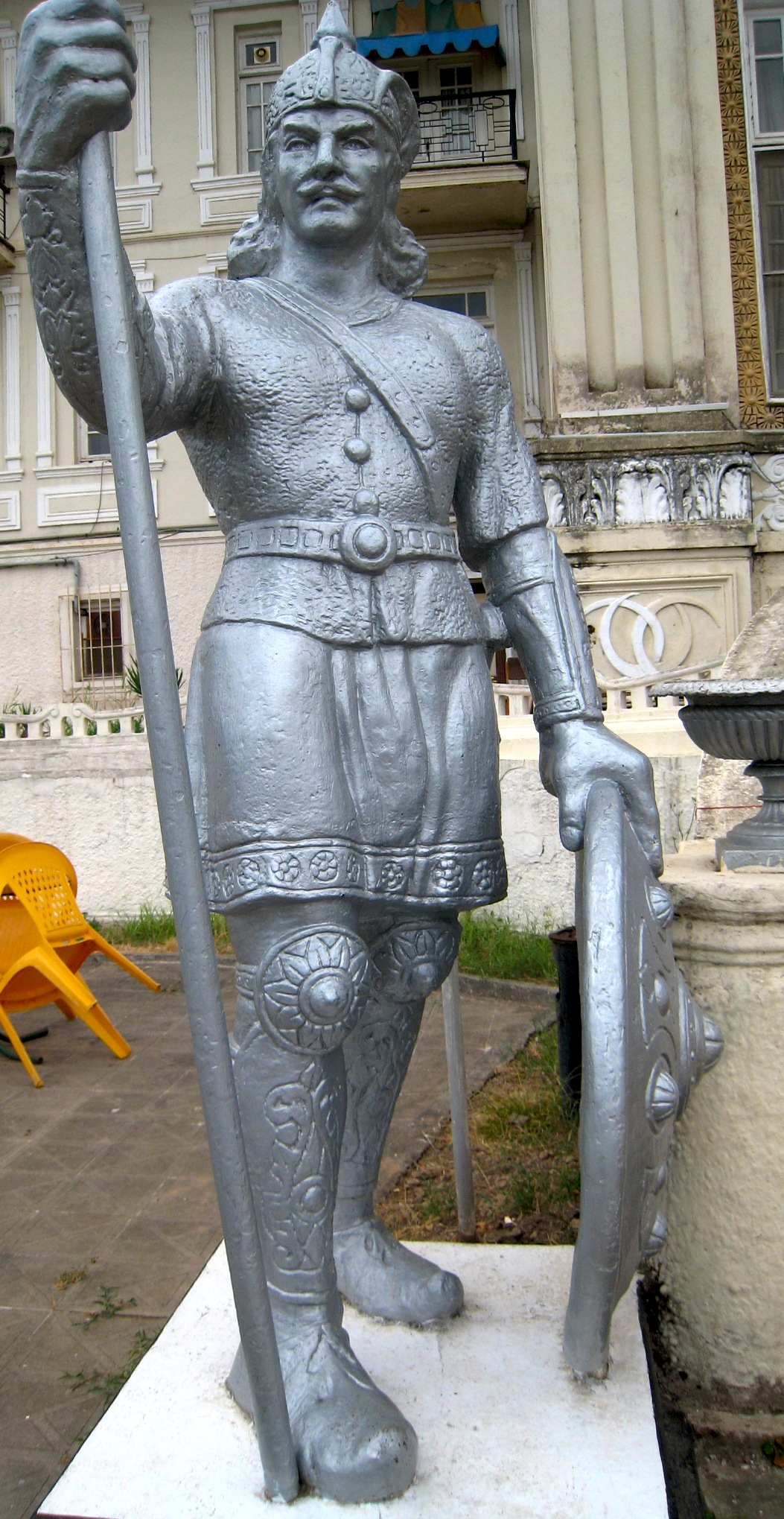
Esfandiyār

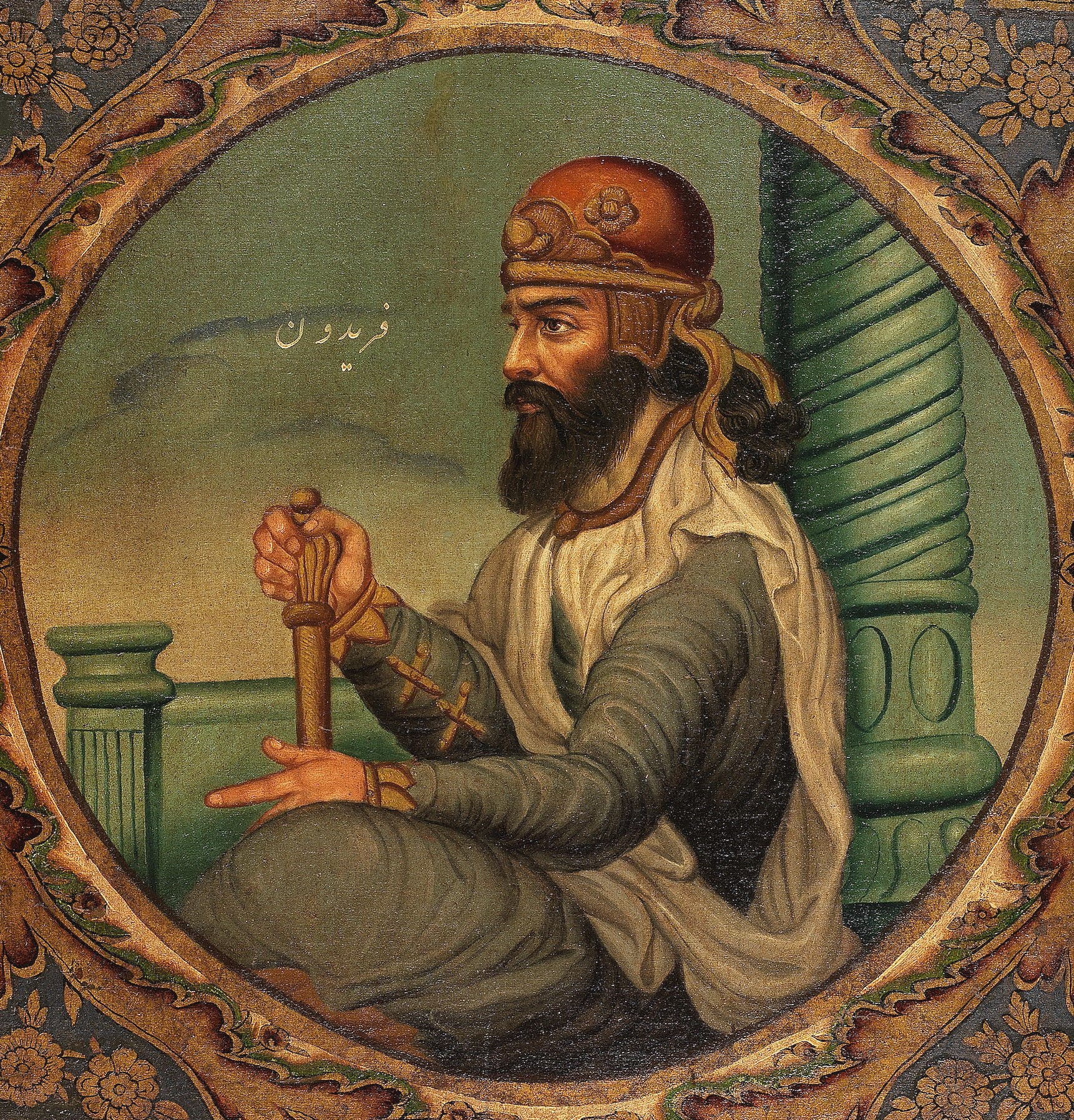
Fereydun

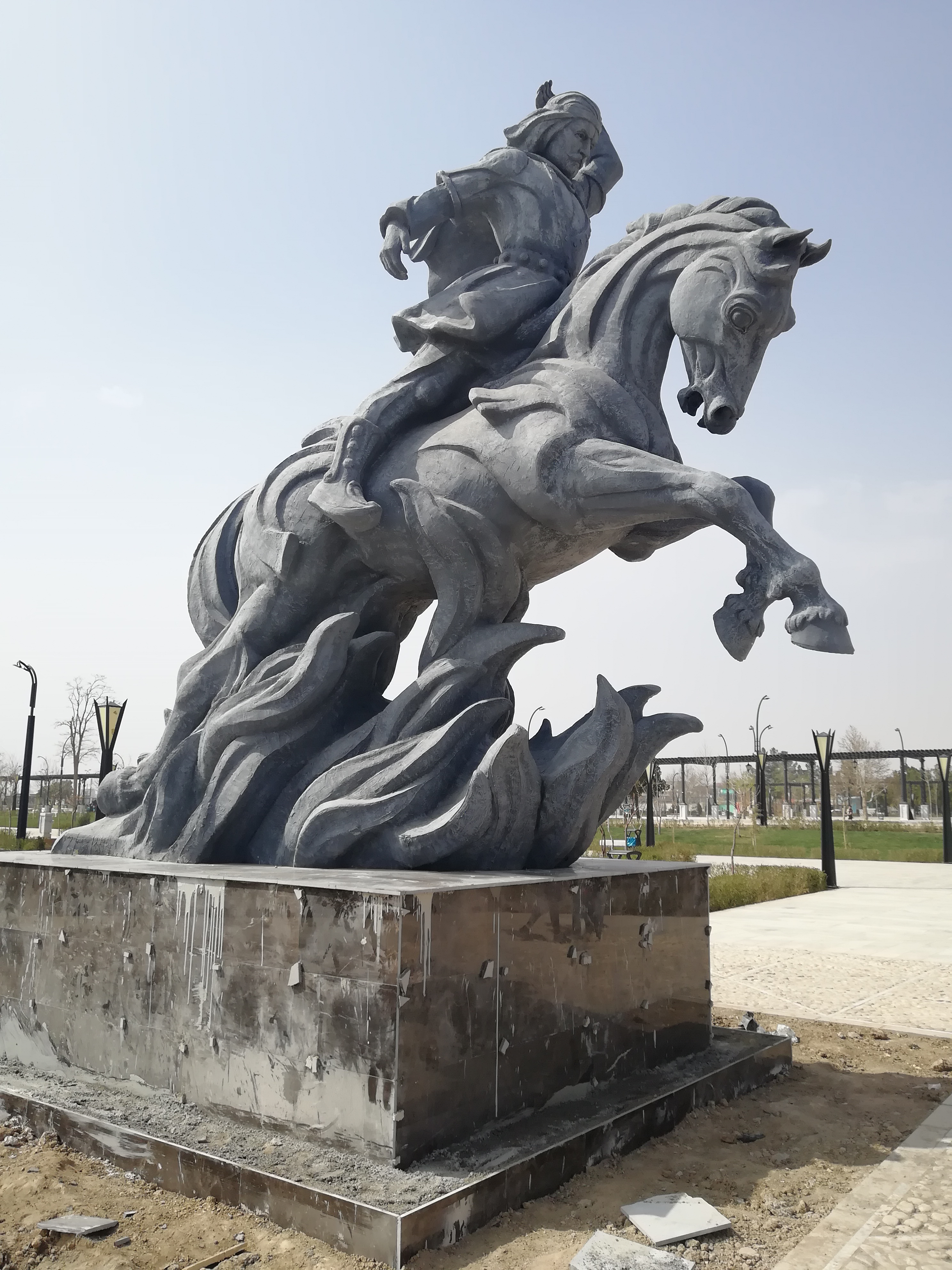
Siavash

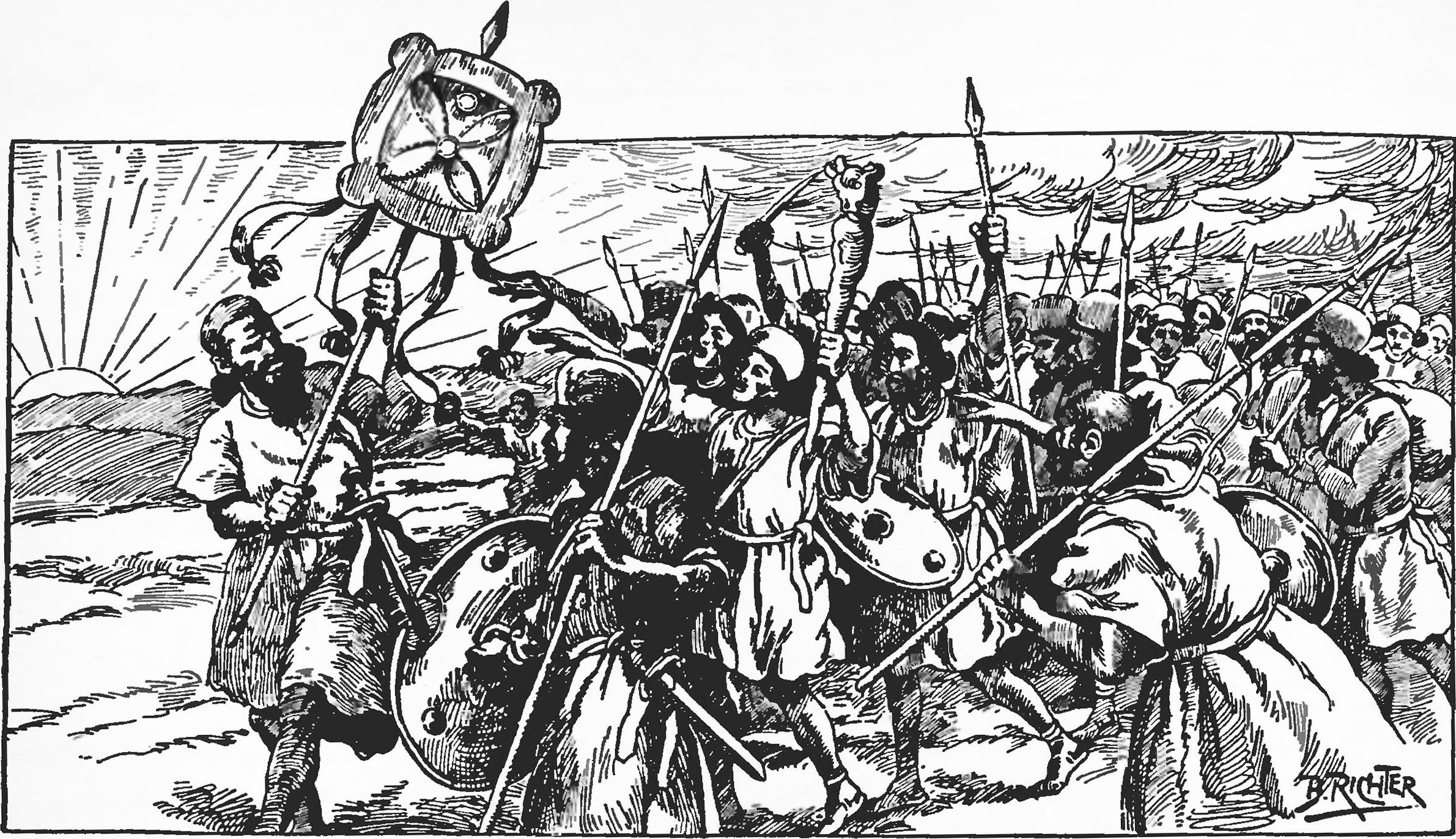
Kaveh the Blacksmith

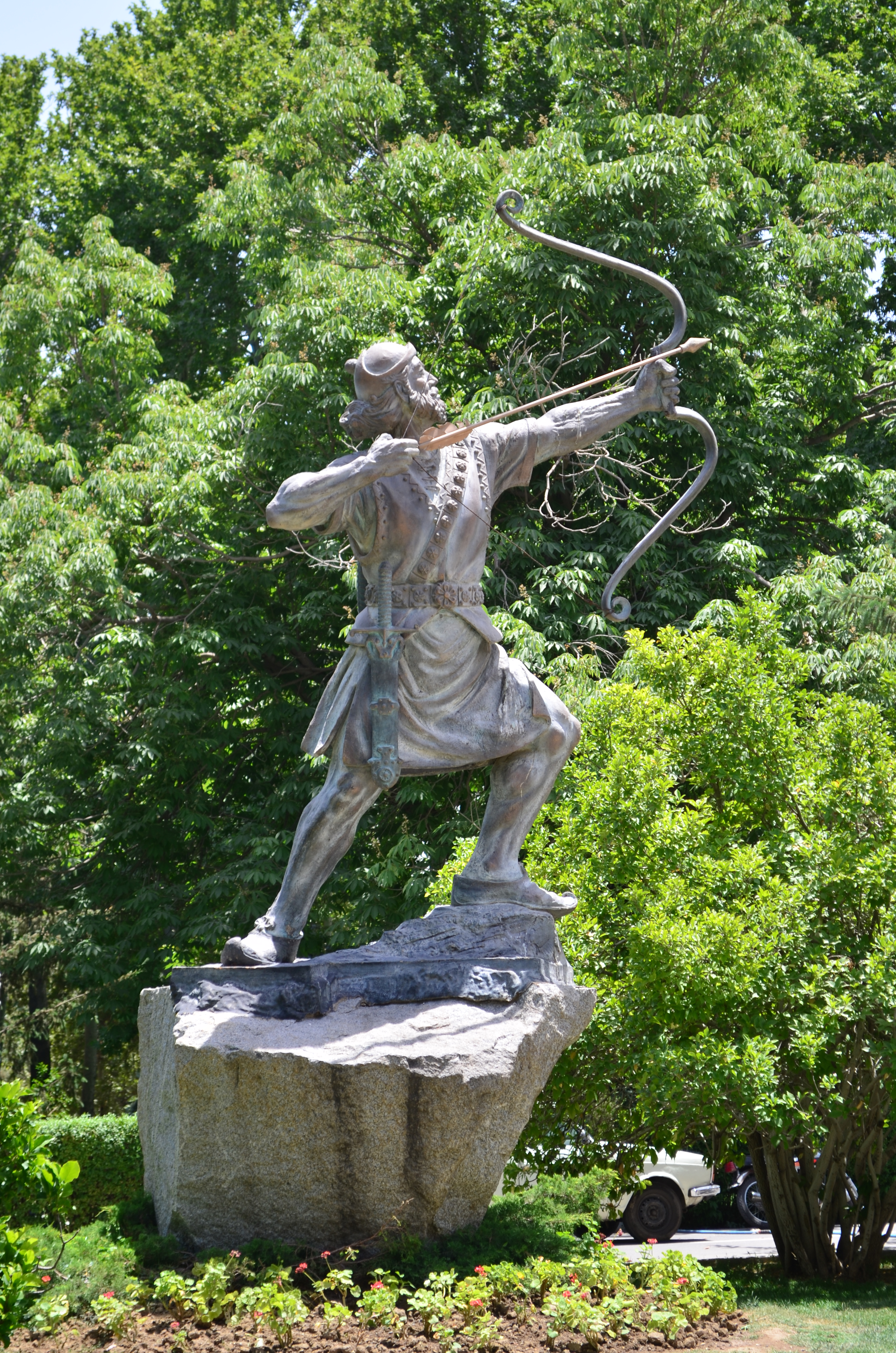
Arash the Archer

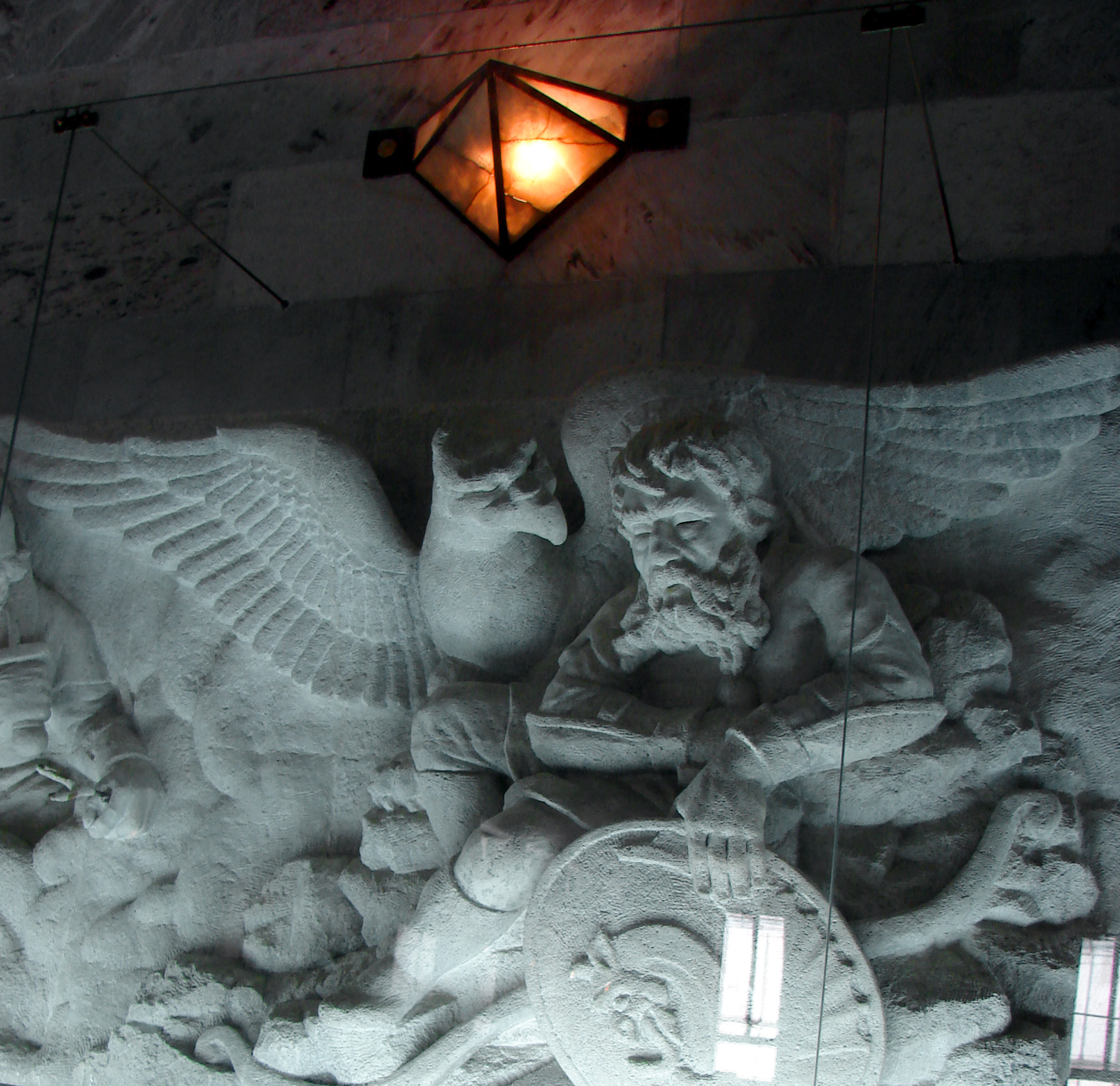
Zāl

== Symbols in the Iranian calendar ==
=== Zodiac symbols for the months ===
Each month of the Solar Hijri calendar (the official calendar of Iran) corresponds to a sign of the zodiac.

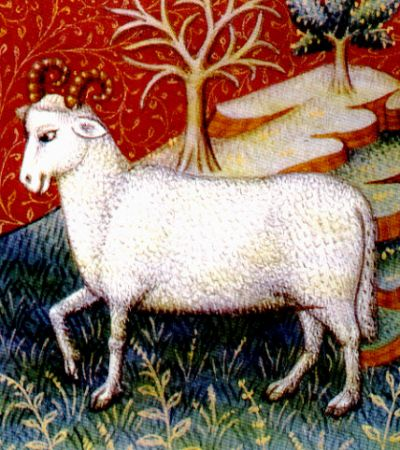
Symbol of Farvardin (Aries)

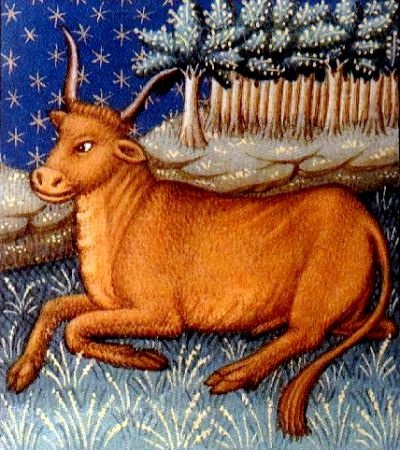
Symbol of Ordibehesht (Taurus)

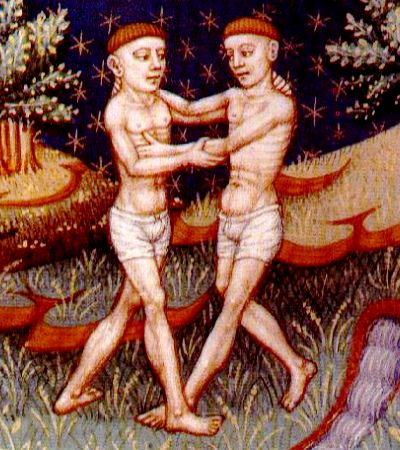
Symbol of Khordad (Gemini)

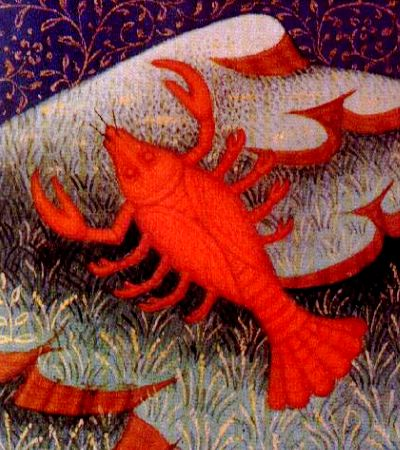
Symbol of Tir (Cancer)

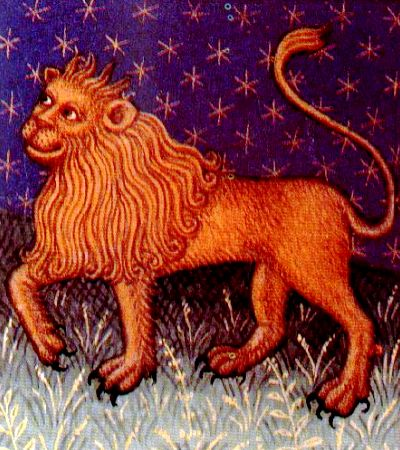
Symbol of Mordad (Leo)

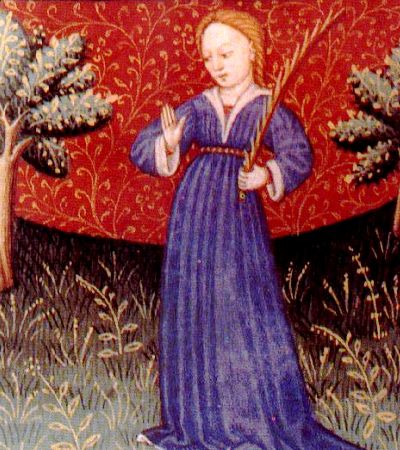
Symbol of Shahrivar (Virgo or the Virgin)

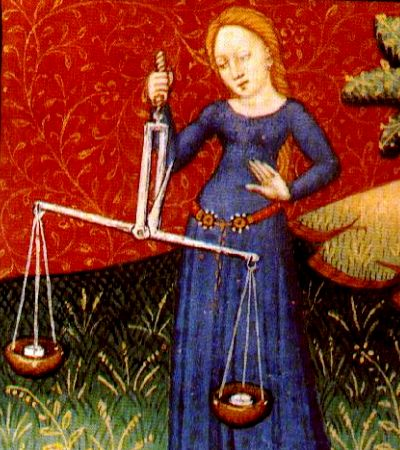
Symbol of Mehr (Libra)

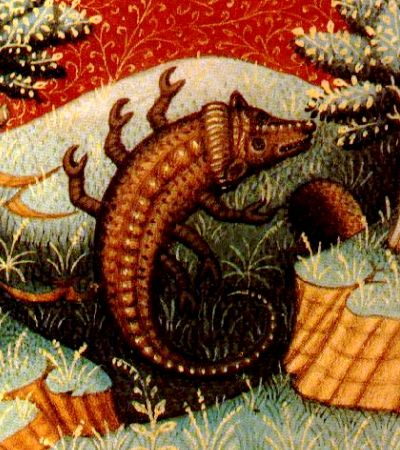
Symbol of Aban (Scorpio)

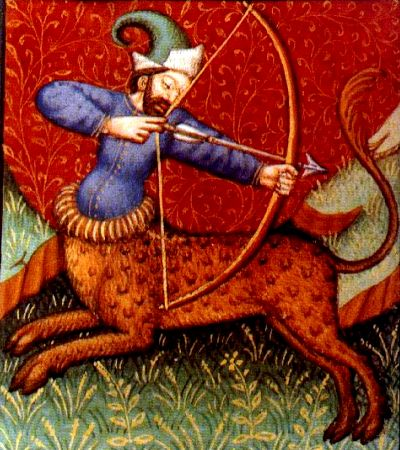
Symbol of Azar (Sagittarius)

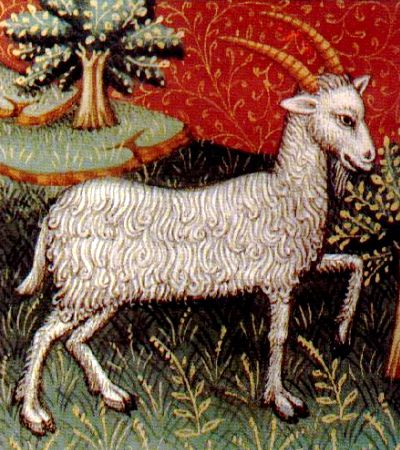
Symbol of Dey (Capricorn)

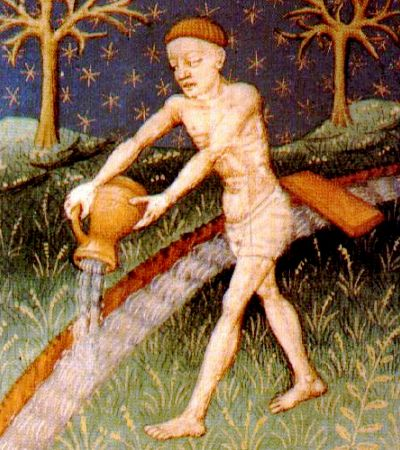
Symbol of Bahman (Aquarius)

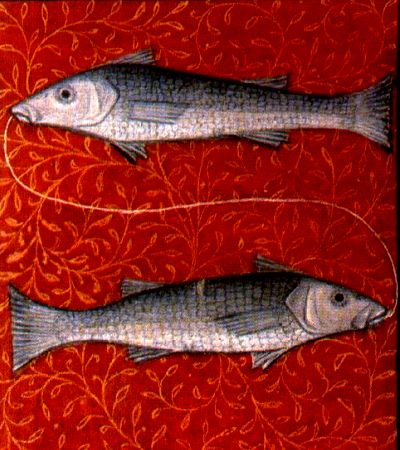
Symbol of Esfand (Pisces)

=== Animal symbols for the years ===
Animal calendar cycle
1. Year of the Rat
2. Year of the Ox
3. Year of the Tiger (or Leopard in some traditions)
4. Year of the Rabbit
5. Year of the Whale (or Dragon in related traditions)
6. Year of the Snake
7. Year of the Horse
8. Year of the Goat (or Sheep)
9. Year of the Monkey
10. Year of the Rooster (or Hen)
11. Year of the Dog
12. Year of the Pig

== National flag of Iran ==
Flag of the Islamic Republic of Iran

Civil flag of Iran during the Pahlavi era

Iranian Lion and Sun civil and state flag

Iranian Lion and Sun war flag

== National anthem of Iran ==
- Royal Salute (1873–1909)
- Salute of the Sublime State of Persia (1909–1933)
- Imperial Anthem of Iran (1933–1979)
- Lion and Sun Flag Anthem (1933–1979)
- Payandeh Bada Iran (1980–1990)
- Mehr-e Khavaran (1990–present)

== Governmental emblems ==
=== Qajar era ===
Emblems during the Qajar era can generally be divided into Military rank emblems (for sword-bearers) and Emblems for notables.

Military rank emblems had eight levels, in the following order: 1. Noyan-e Azam 2. Amir Toman 3. Sartip 4. Sarhang 5. Yavar 6. Soltani 7. Nayeb 8. Vakil. These were sash-style with colorful ribbons, from which hung a medal depicting the Lion and Sun at the bottom. Rank was distinguished by the colors.

- Order of the Portrait of the Commander of the Faithful
- Order of the Aqdas (highest Lion and Sun order until 1311 AH)
- Order of Qods (second Lion and Sun order until 1311 AH)
- Order of the Sacred (third Lion and Sun order until 1311 AH)
- Order of the Royal Portrait
- Order of the Crown
- Order of Lion and Sun (in 5 classes from 1311 AH)
- Order of the Sun (for women)
- Order of Zolfaghar
- Order of Sepah
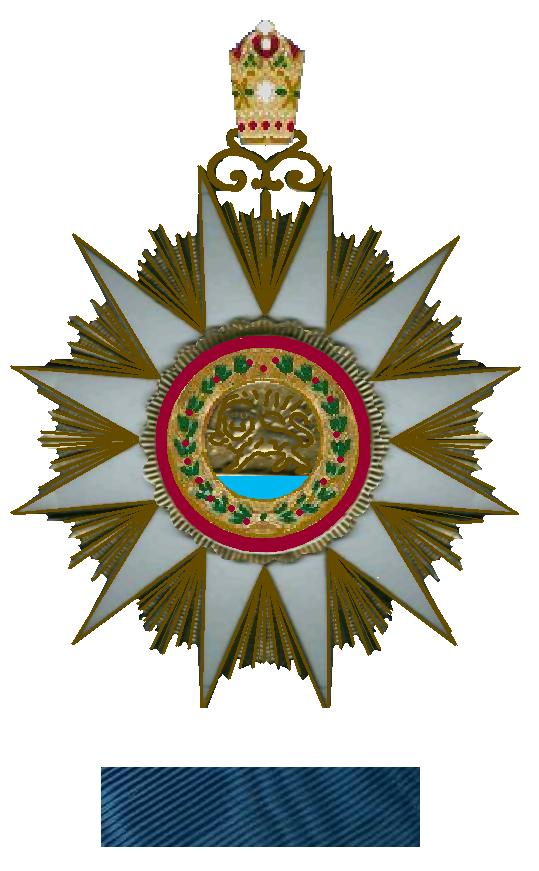
Highest sacred order emblem during the Qajar era

=== Pahlavi era ===
Royal standards of the Pahlavi dynasty — personal flags of the Shah, Shahbanu, and Crown Prince — were selected in 1971. Blue is the colour of the Pahlavi family, hence the blue field of these flags.

Flag of the Shah of Iran

Flag of the Shahbanu of Iran

Flag of the Crown Prince of Iran

Naval (war) ensign of Iran during Pahlavi era

Imperial orders of the Pahlavi era

- Order of Pahlavi
- Order of Zolfaghar
- Order of Aryamehr
- Order of the Crown
- Order of the Pleiades
- Order of Homayoun
- Order of 3 Esfand
- Order of the Red Lion and Sun
- Order of Sepah
- Order of Pas
- Order of Avicenna
- Order of Merit
- Order of Honor
- Order of Service
- Order of Splendor
- Order of Knowledge
- Order of Art
The combination of the Pahlavi Crown and the Lion and Sun, used as the header of official documents during the Pahlavi era.

Personal emblem of the Shah

Personal emblem of the Crown Prince Reza Pahlavi

Personal emblem of the Shahbanu

=== Islamic Republic era ===
Emblem of the Islamic Republic of Iran

Supreme Order of Islamic Revolution

Supreme Order of Independence

Supreme Order of Freedom

Supreme Order of Islamic Republic
Emblem of the General Staff of the Armed Forces of the Islamic Republic of Iran

Supreme Order of Fath

Order of Zolfaghar (Islamic Republic version)

== Symbols on Iranian currency ==
=== Qajar era ===
Symbols used on currency during the Qajar era included portraits of the Shah, the Lion and Sun, and various designs.

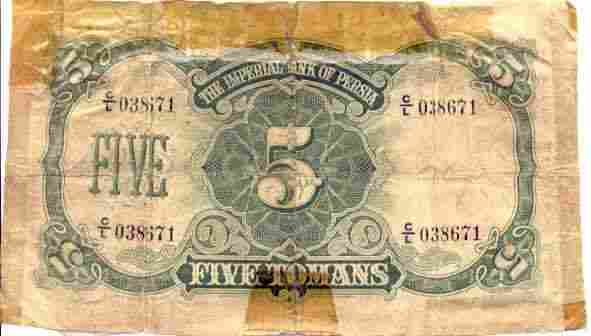

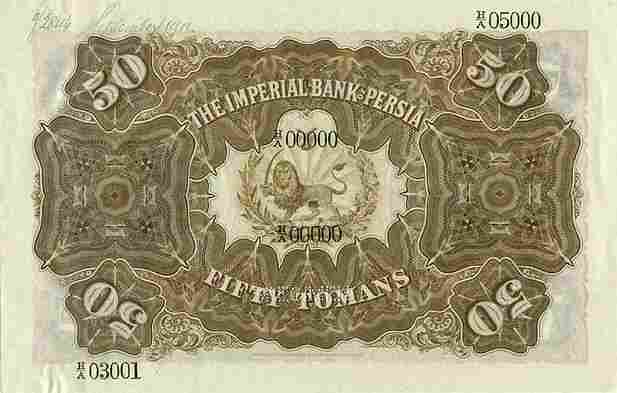

=== Pahlavi era ===
Symbols on banknotes during the Pahlavi monarchy, in addition to the Lion and Sun and royal portraits, included images of Persepolis, the Tomb of Daniel, Mount Damavand, the Alborz Mountains, Tachara palace, the old Dezful bridge, Taq-e Bostan, tribute-bearers reliefs, the Zoroastrian Nowruz symbol, the royal seal of Darius the Great, Ali Qapu, Darius the Great, the Allahverdi Khan bridge, the Abadan Refinery, the National Bank of Iran building, the Kuhrang tunnel and dam, the Pahlavi Crown, the Tomb of Hafez, the Marlik cup, the Ramsar Hotel, the Karaj Dam, the Veresk bridge, and others.

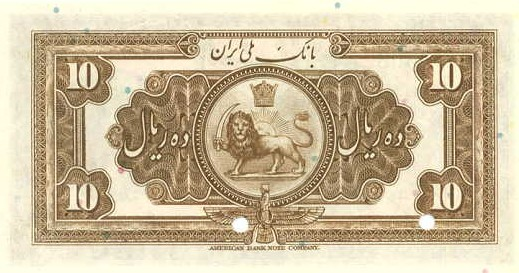
Lion and Sun

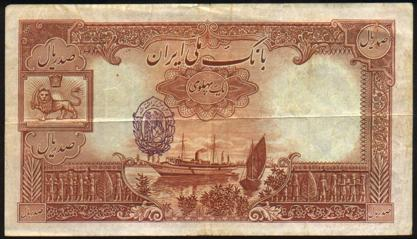
Persian Gulf

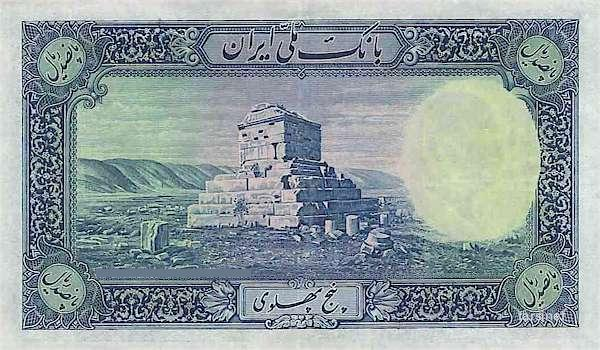
Tomb of Cyrus the Great

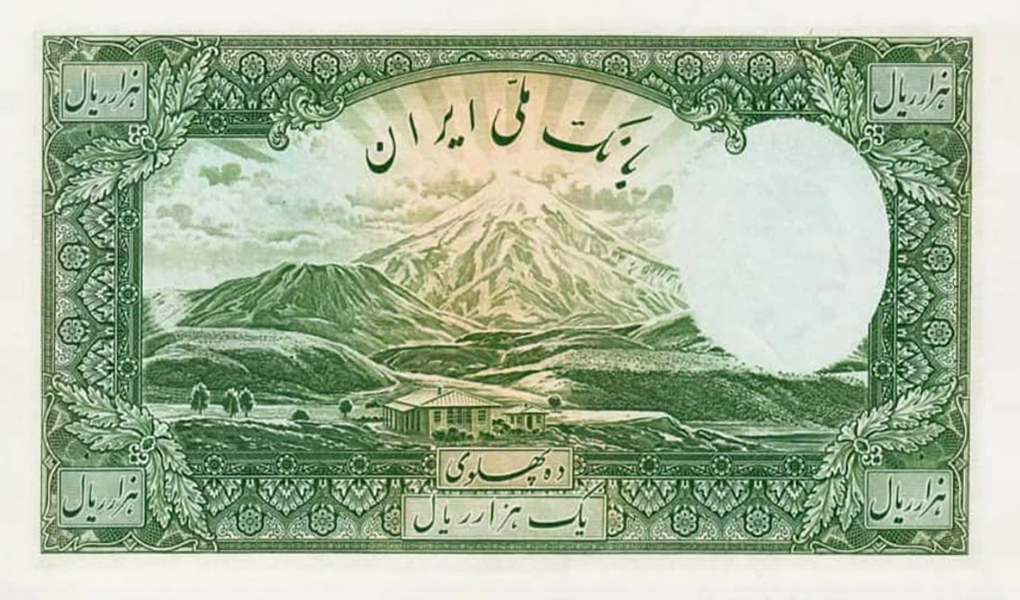
Damavand

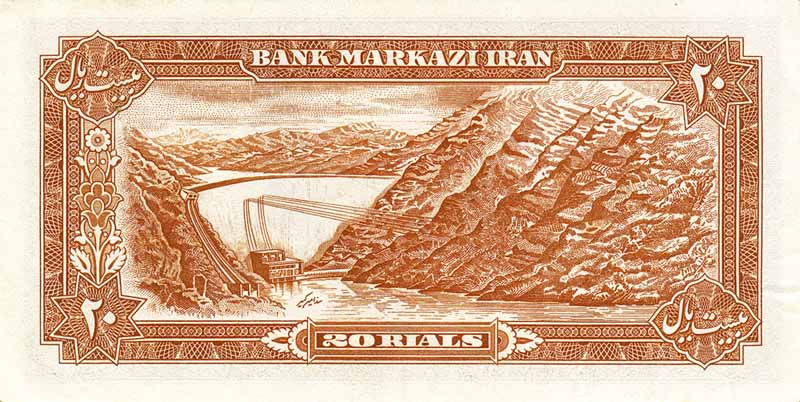
Karaj Dam

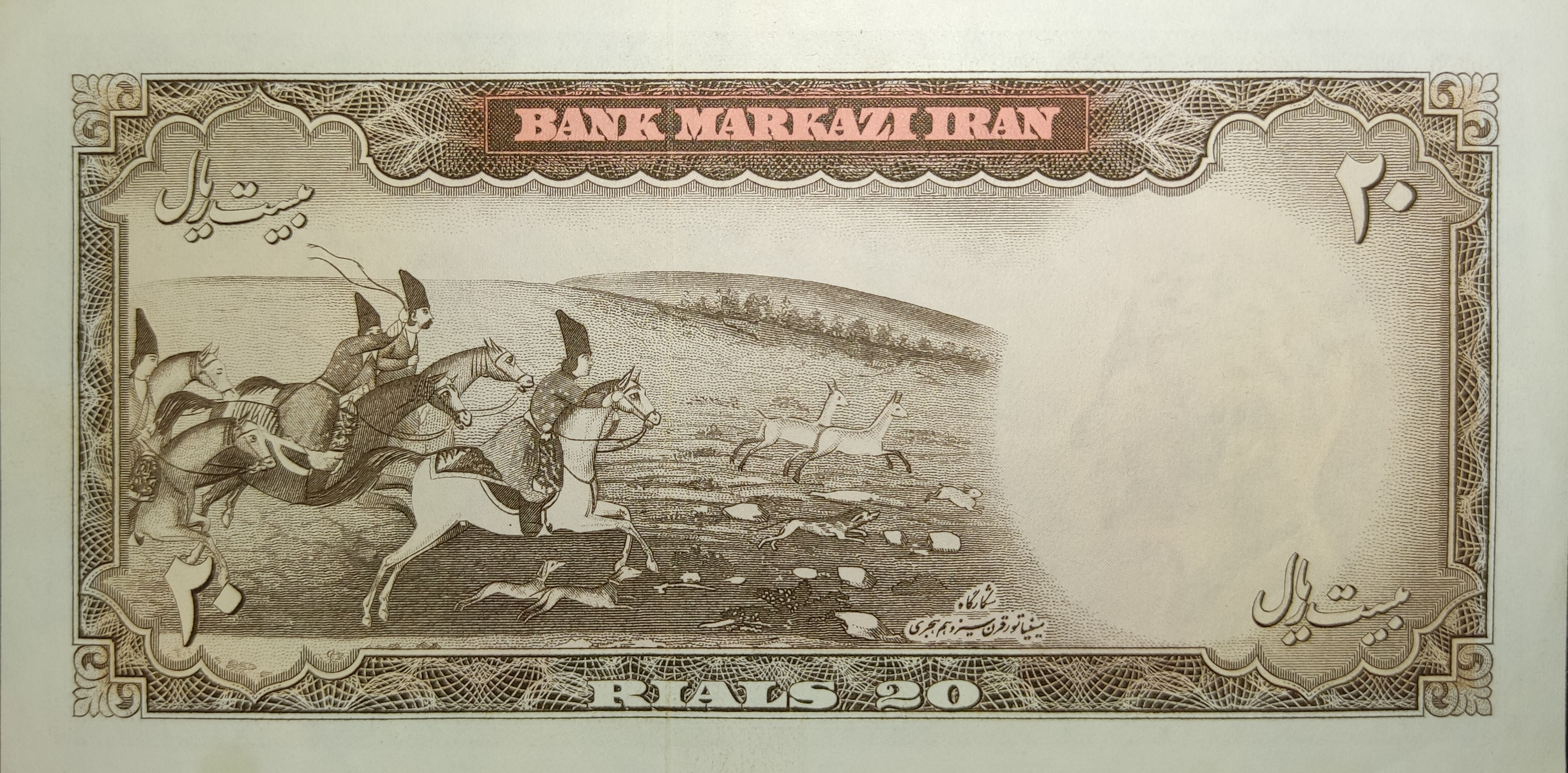
Miniature

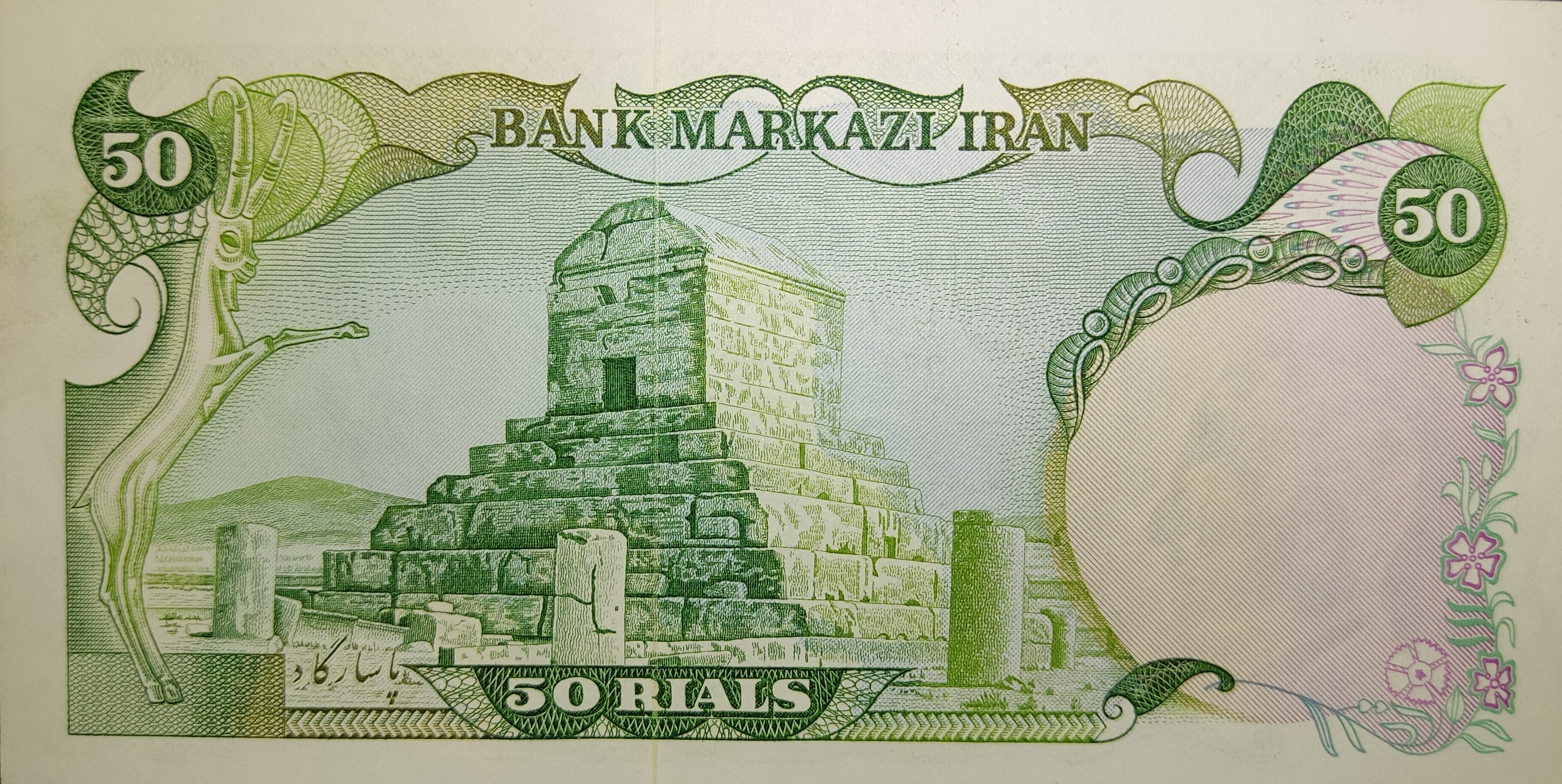
Tomb of Cyrus the Great

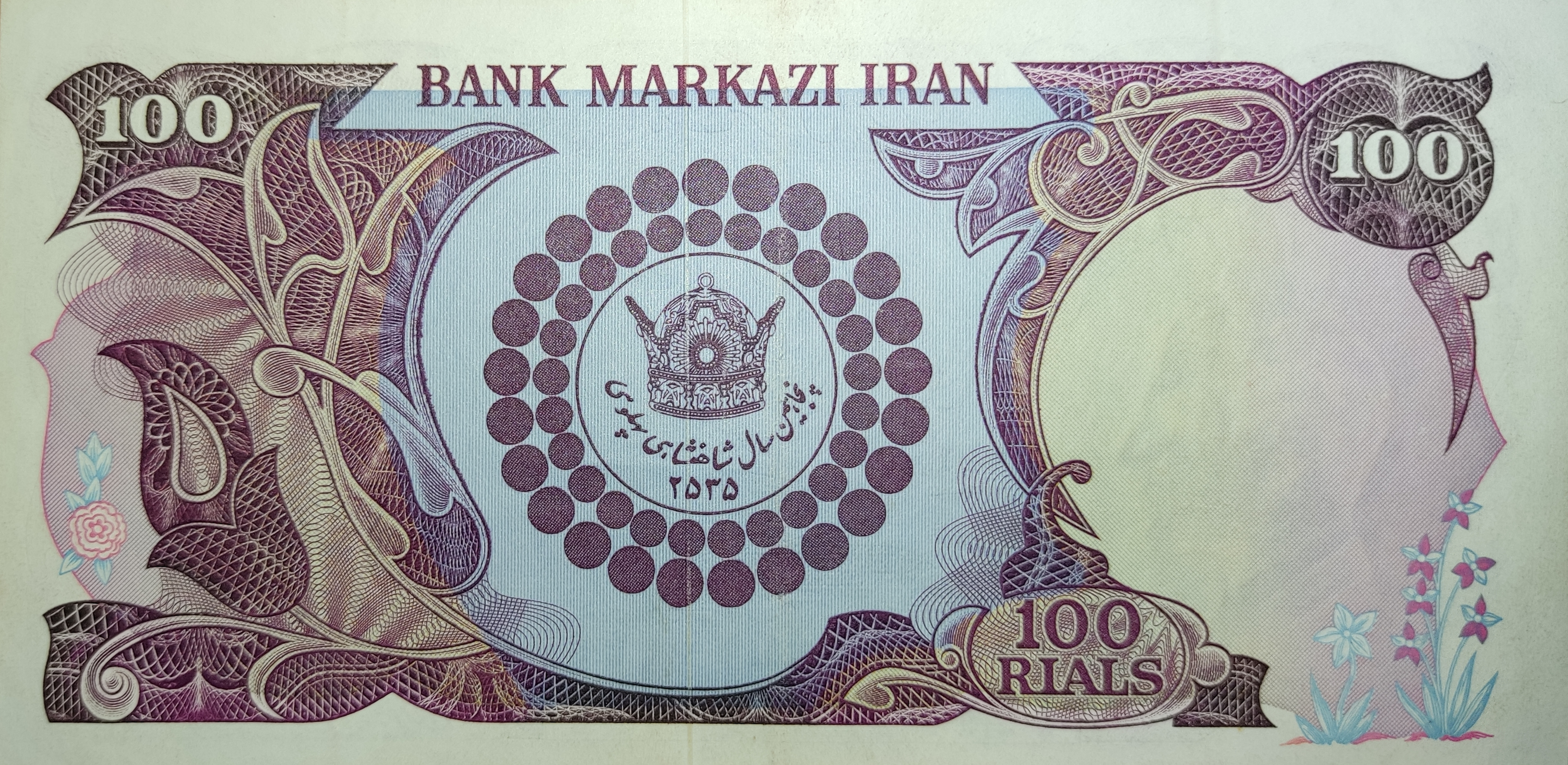
Imperial calendar

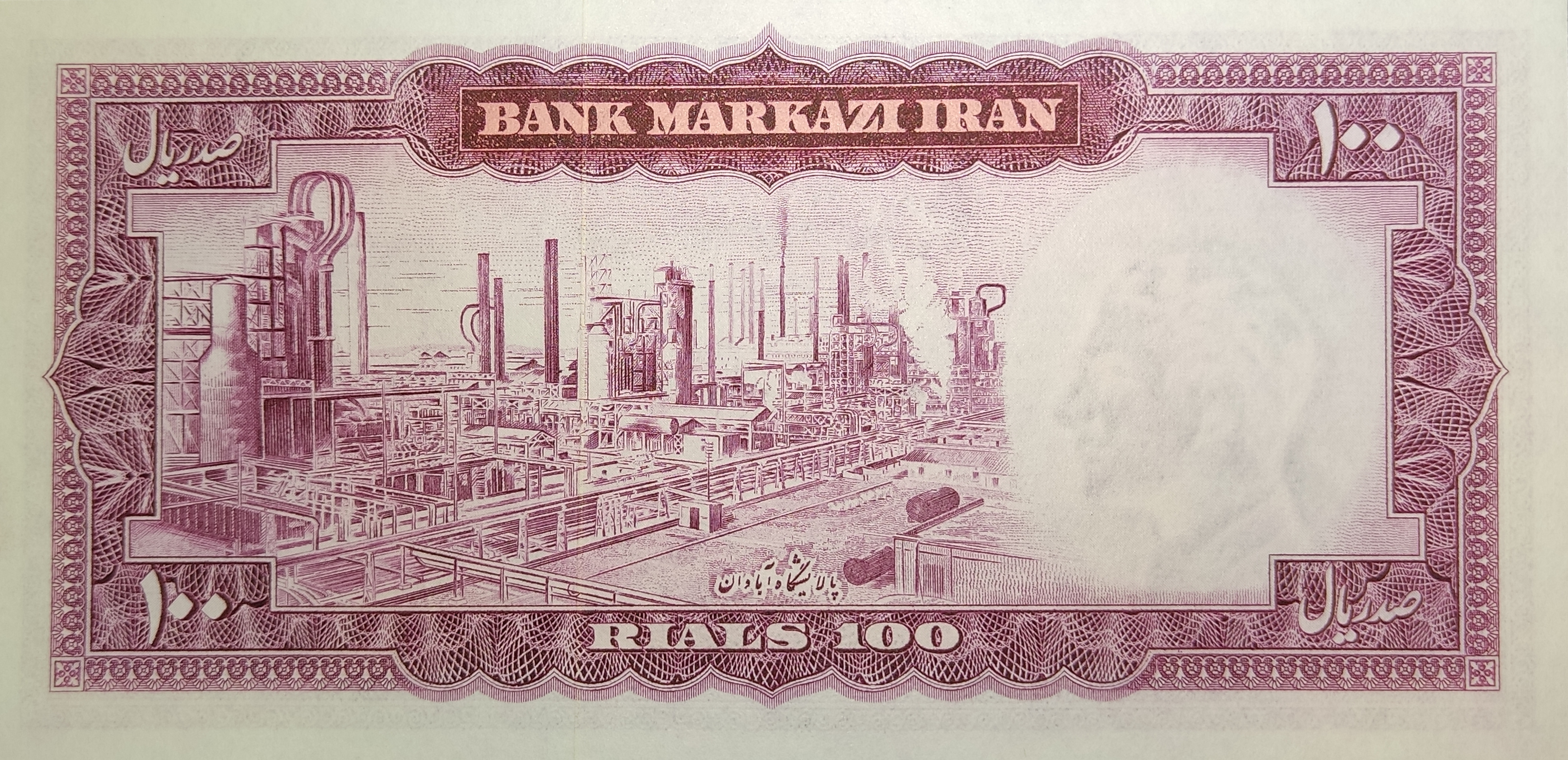
Abadan Refinery

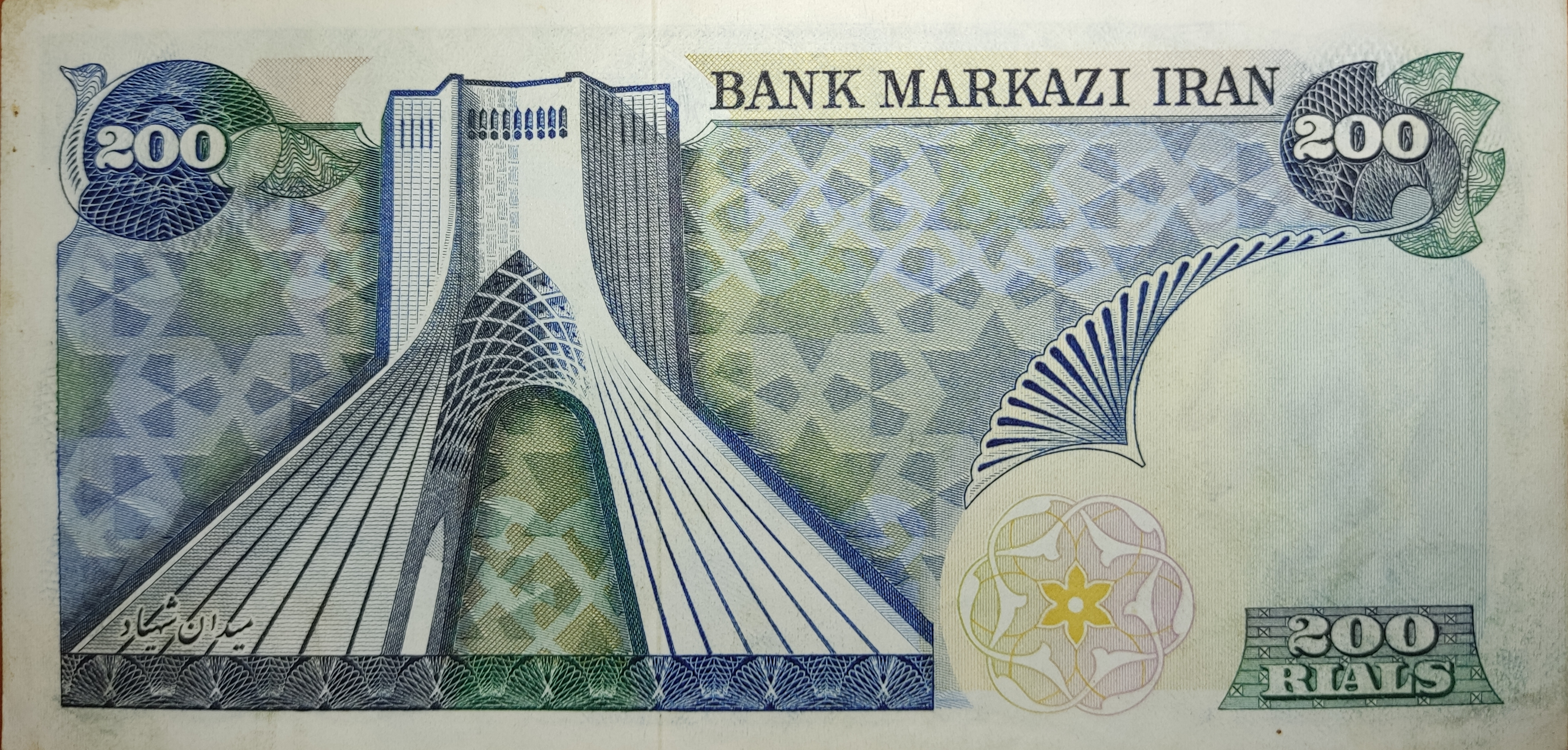
Azadi Tower

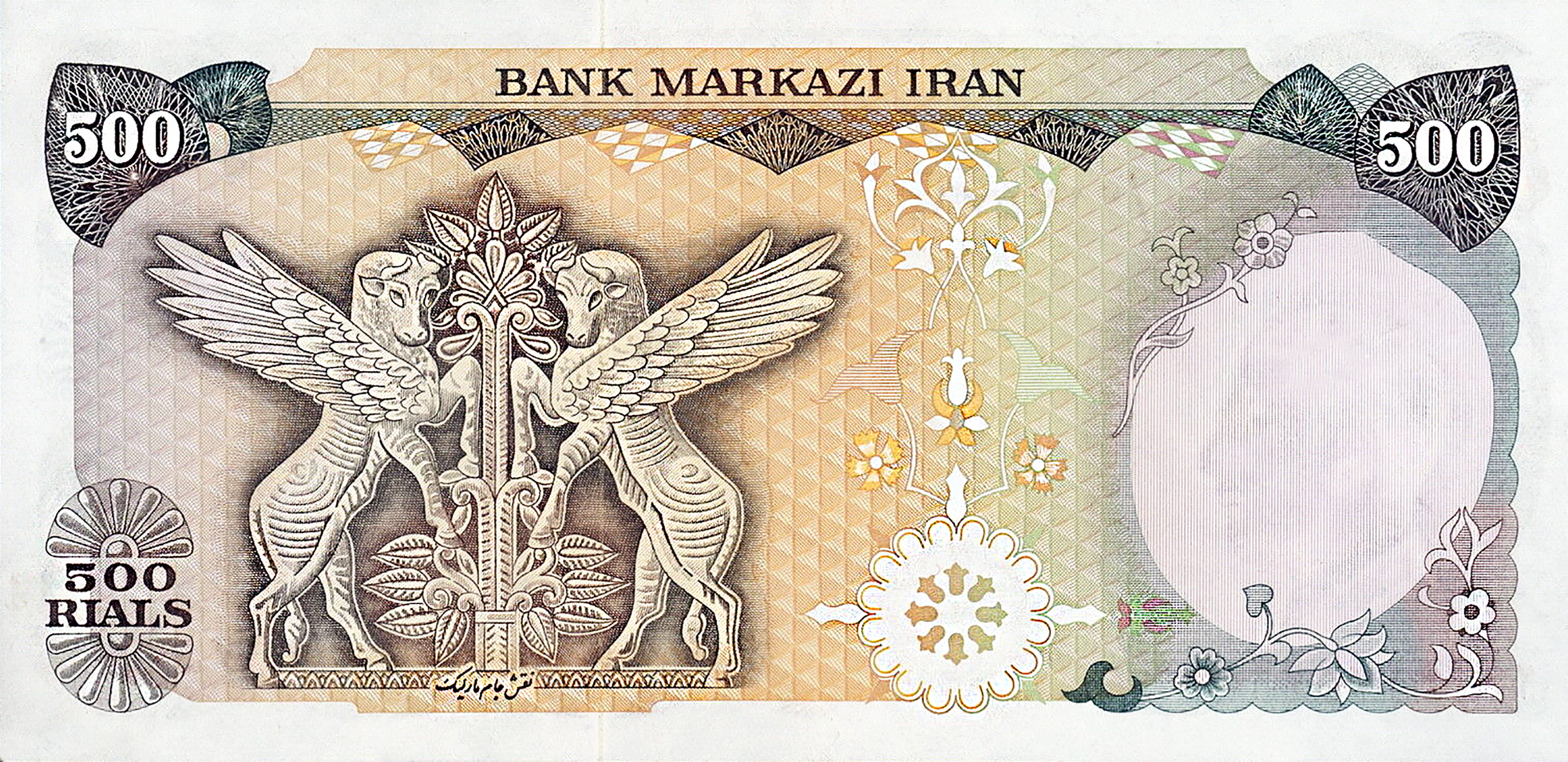
Marlik cup

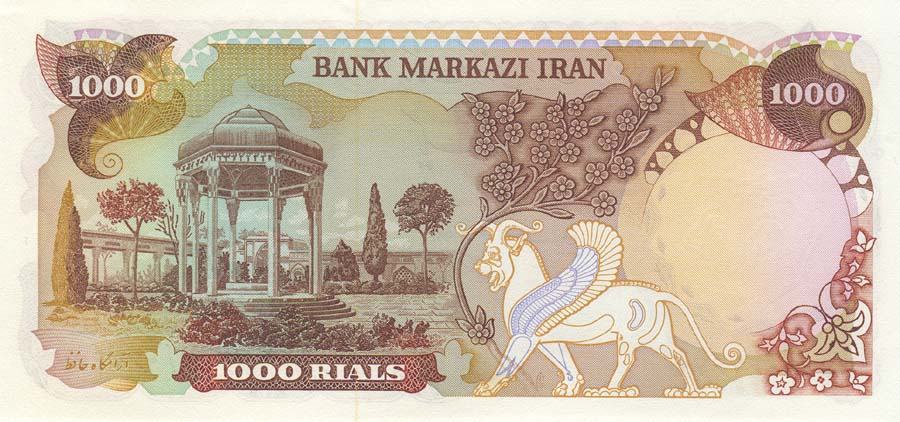
Tomb of Hafez

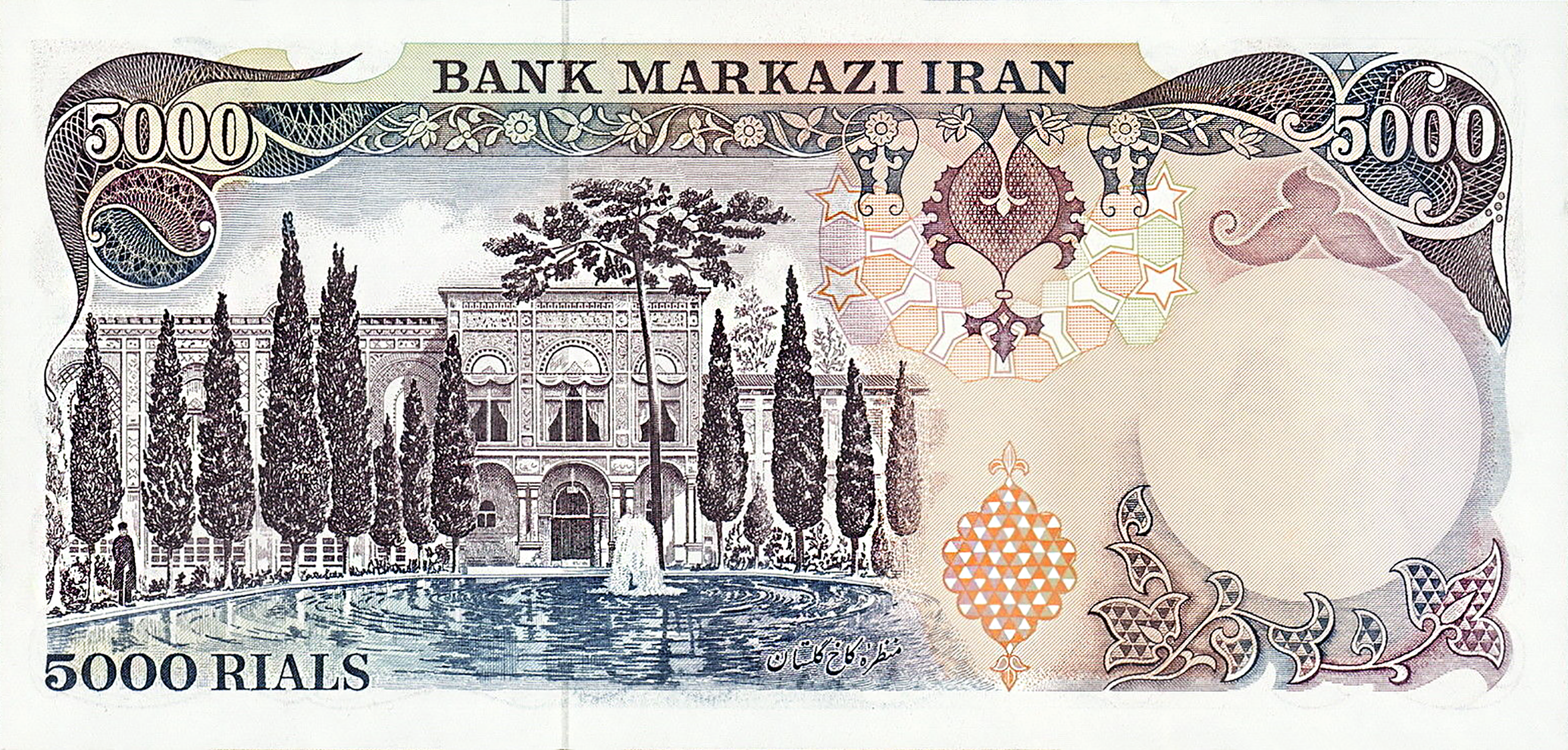
Golestan Palace

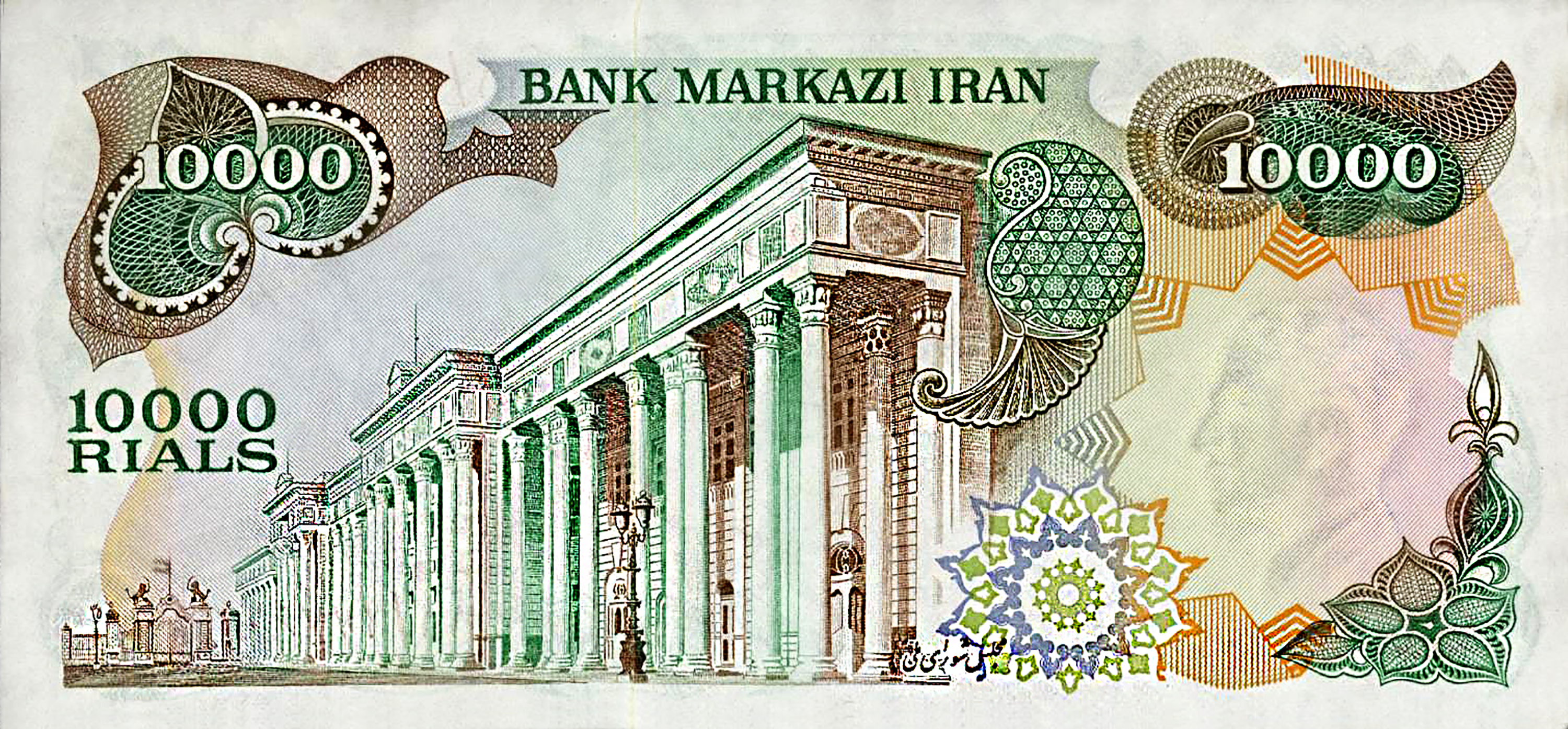
National Consultative Assembly

=== Islamic Republic era ===
Symbols on current banknotes during the Islamic Republic era, in addition to portraits of the Supreme Leader of Iran and Seyyed Hassan Modarres, include images of Al-Aqsa Mosque, Jerusalem, the Kaaba, the main gate of the University of Tehran, the Tomb of Saadi, the Imam Reza shrine, Naqsh-e Jahan Square, Mount Damavand, the Omid satellite, the nuclear energy symbol, and others.

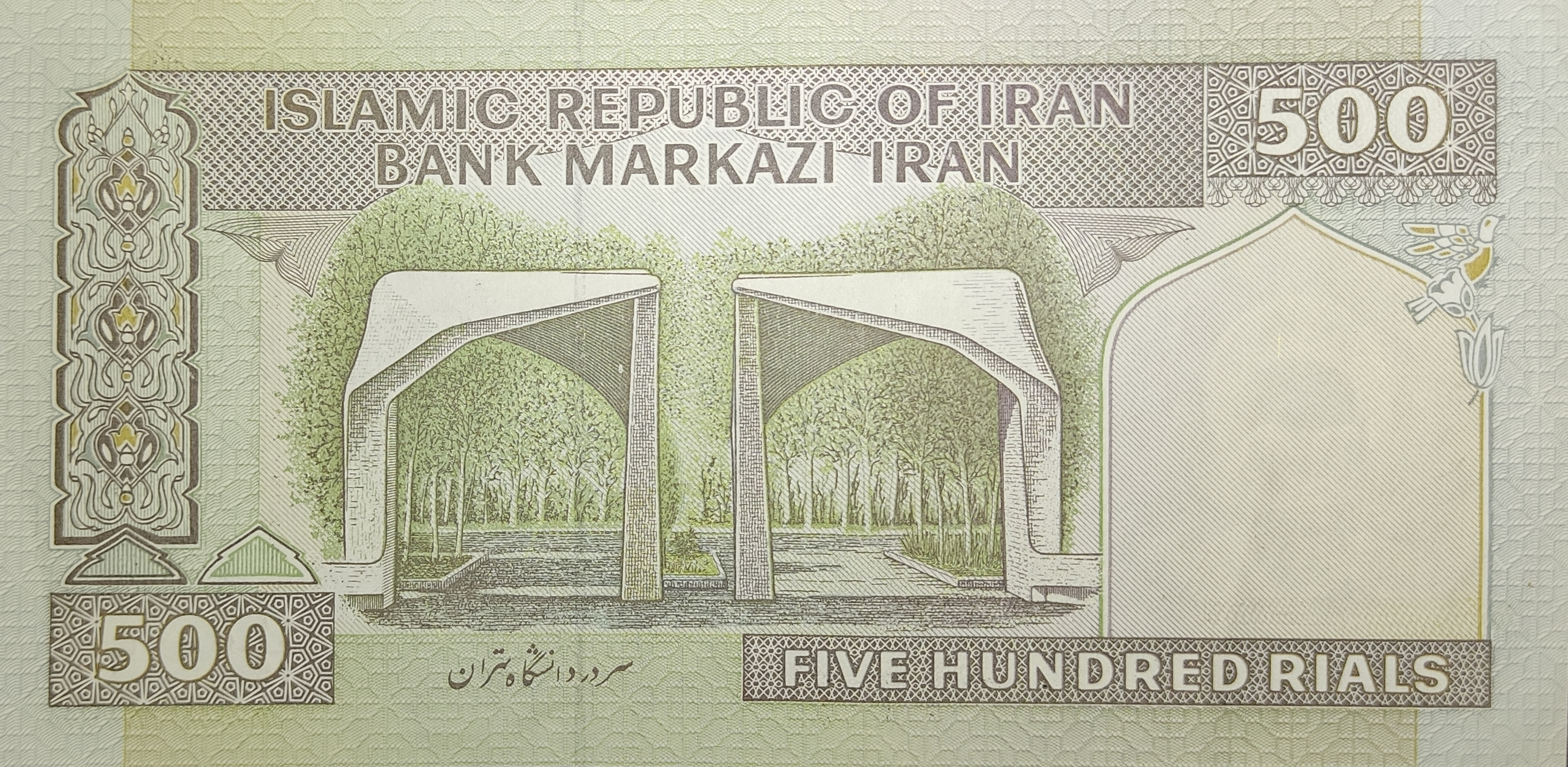
Main gate of the University of Tehran

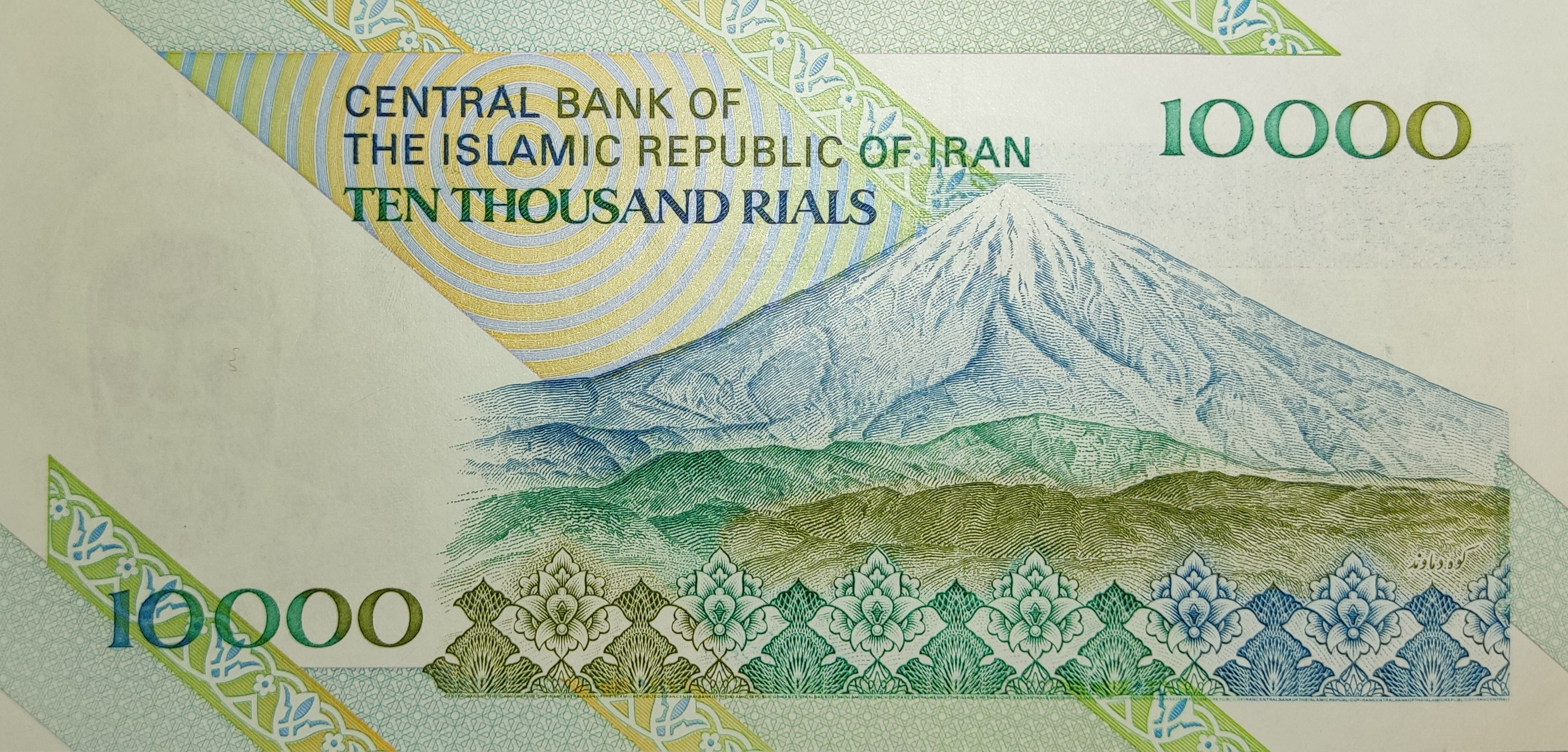
Damavand

== See also ==
UNESCO Intangible Cultural Heritage Lists
