= 2016 Cyrus the Great Revolt =

Protest that took place in Iran on Cyrus the Great Day

2016 Cyrus The Great Revolt
- Part of the 2017–2021 Iranian protests, the Iranian Democracy Movement
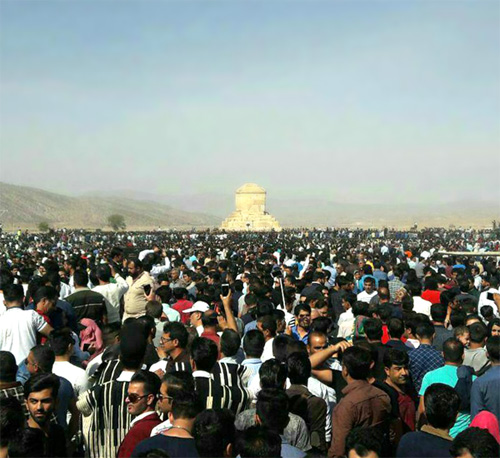
- Gatherings at Pasargadae on 28 October 2016
- Date: 28 October 2016
- Location: Tomb of Cyrus, Pasargadae, Iran
- Methods: Demonstrations, chanting of Nationalist and Monarchist slogans
- Result: Continued rise of monarchist sentiment in Iran; Beginning of Iranian Democracy Movement, with the revival of protests as means of public opposition in Iran, later resulting in the 2017-2018 Iranian protests; Banning of Cyrus The Great Day; Politicisation of Cyrus The Great Day as an anti-government symbol

Parties
Protesters, mainly (Pahlavi Iran) Monarchists	Government of Iran; Police Command; Islamic Revolutionary Guard Corps; Basij; Ansar-e Hezbollah

Number
15,000-20,000 people	

The 2016 Cyrus the Great Revolt (Persian: اعتراضات ۱۳۹۵ آرامگاه کوروش بزرگ) was a monarchist protest in Iran that took place at the Tomb of Cyrus the Great during a commemoration of Cyrus the Great Day. This protest gathered tens of thousands of Iranians, and led to instances of crackdown and arrest from police. This protest inaugurated a series of protests later on that would have increasing calls for regime change.

== History ==
As a result of continued grievances against the Iranian government, including governmental corruption and opposition to Islamic rule, there has been increased sentiments for pre-Islamic nationalism and admiration for former Iranian monarchs. In October 2016, on the anniversary of Cyrus the Great Day, there was a crowd gathering in celebration of the former Persian monarch Cyrus the Great at his tomb as part of celebrations for Persia's pre-Islamic glory.

Cyrus the Great Day, which began in the early 2000s as an invented tradition on the internet and social networking websites, observed by Iranian nationalists and monarchists and democrats to pay homage to Iran's pre-Islamic history, had by the mid-2010s become an unofficial holiday in Iran, being known amongst Iranians as "Cyrus the Great Day" as early as ten years prior (2006) to the protest, as well as an increasingly popular and explicitly anti-government occasion.

The event fell on a Friday, which is a weekend in Iran, allowing for more people than usual to gather, and also coincided with the birthday of former Crown Prince Reza Pahlavi, who has remained a vocal figure of opposition to the Iranian government, and a symbol of support for monarchism in Iran. As such, many monarchist supporters than before were inspired to turn out to the march, with people learning of the upcoming march on internet platforms such as Telegram, and reports stated that people started gathering in the Pasargadae area, especially around the Tomb of Cyrus, from as early as the evening of 27 October 2016, resulting in heavy traffic on roads to the site. In response to the large amounts of people descending on Pasargadae, the main entrance to Pasargadae was closed the night before, with no more cars allowed to enter.

Despite this, on 28 October 2016, the tomb of Cyrus at Pasargadae attracted tens of thousands of people from across the country who celebrated the day and began chanting slogans praising the Achaemenid king, such as: "Cyrus is our father; Iran is our country", which soon began evolving into chants of nationalist slogans criticising Iranian politics, such as "Never sleep Cyrus: Iran has no father"; "Neither Gaza nor Lebanon, My Life for Iran"; "I am Iranian; I do not worship the Arabs"; and "Freedom of thought cannot flow from beards." According to one eyewitness, government agents tried to drown out the chanting by blaring music from loudspeakers. Pro-Shah and anti-Arab slogans were chanted, and nomads, tribesmen and ethnic minorities, including Kurds and Iranian Arabs, were also present at the celebrations in their traditional ethnic clothing. Despite the anti-Arab slogans chanted by some, a perception by many Iranians that Arab cultural dominance has entered Iran through the government's political Islam, Iranian Arabs, travelling from as far west as Khuzestan, gathered in support of the protest, chanting slogans in Arabic in support of indigenous minorities and the use of their native languages, which has often been repressed by the Iranian government in favour of Persian.

The sheer number of people who showed up at Pasargadae has been described as "surprising" with those who had witnessed similar get-togethers saying they had never seen such a large gathering. An unofficial 2017 estimate put the attendance figure at between 15,000 and 20,000 people, which was described as "unprecedented" according to spectators. The locals, including those living in Pasargadae village, were also "amazed" by the sheer number of visitors.

As the slogans began to quickly escalate into full-scale demonstrations at Pasargadae against the Iranian government, the largest in Iran since the 2009 Iranian presidential election protests, plainclothed government agents surrounded Cyrus's tomb as the crowd continued to gather, threatening people and physically attacking them in order to prevent them from getting close to the monument. Several arrests were also reported, including satirist and actor Mohammad Reza Ali Payam. However, neither the police nor security forces appeared to intervene during the protest unlike previous demonstrations in Iran, which created the impression to many Iranians that the government was appearing to lose its control over public discontent. This led to the revival of the protest as a means of public disobedience in Iran, after it had largely been repressed since the 2009 protests. The protest also marked the beginning of the Iranian Democracy Movement, placing its demands and its goals to the centre of Iranian politics, and placed monarchist sentiment as central to the growing anti-government opposition in Iran. As such, the protest would eventually lead to the 2017–2018 Iranian protests, which marked a significant moment in the Iranian Democracy Movement.

== Slogan and tactics ==
Iranian protesters chanted slogans such as "Iran is our country, Cyrus is our father. The clerical rule is synonymous with only tyranny, only war", and "Freedom of thought cannot take place with beards. No Gaza, no Palestine, we will only sacrifice ourselves for Iran!" Many chants praised the former Pahlavi dynasty with many protesting in support of Iran's past monarchy of former Shah that was overthrown by the 1979 Revolution. Another chant was "Happy Birthday, O Prince!" referencing the Shah of Iran's son whose birthday was on October 31.

Other slogans praised the late Shah of Iran Mohammad Reza Pahlavi and expressed anti-Arab sentiment.

== Government response ==
The Iranian government would respond to the growing perception it was unable to crackdown by jailing the event organizers and protesters as well as banning Cyrus the Great Day celebrations in subsequent years, despite illegal demonstrations continuing to take place at Pasargadae each year.

Protest organizers were arrested by the order of the government. Iranians have been banned ever since the protest from celebrating Cyrus the Great Day at Pasargadae, the site of Cyrus the Great's tomb, despite thousands of Iranians returning in following years.

In years after the 2016 event crowds of Iranians have attempted to go back to rally at the tomb for Cyrus the Great Day, however state police and Islamic Revolutionary Guard blocked all paths to the ancient tomb. There were also reports of government forces disguised in plain clothes beating Iranians who came to visit the site. In 2021, the elderly parents of the recently executed Navid Afkari, were arrested for having a picture of Cyrus the Great on a birthday cake. The Iranian government denied the popularity of Iran's former monarchy. The Cultural Heritage and Tourism Minister, Ezzatollah Zarghami, called for the construction of water walls adjacent to the tomb that would result in damage to the tomb. As of 2021, the government's revolution guard has shut down the site every year to prevent gatherings at the site since 2017.

Prominent Shia Cleric Hossein Nouri-Hamedani criticized the praise of Cyrus the Great, quoting late supreme Leader Ruhollah Khomeini by saying "Those with tendencies toward Cyrus are anti-revolutionary." MohammadReza Alee Payam was arrested for participating in the protesting according to his son.

== See also ==
- 2,500-year celebration of the Persian Empire
- 2017–18 Iranian protests
