= Tomb of Cyrus the Great =

Ancient Persian tomb in Pasargadae, Iran

Tomb of Cyrus the Great آرامگاه کوروش بزرگ (Persian)
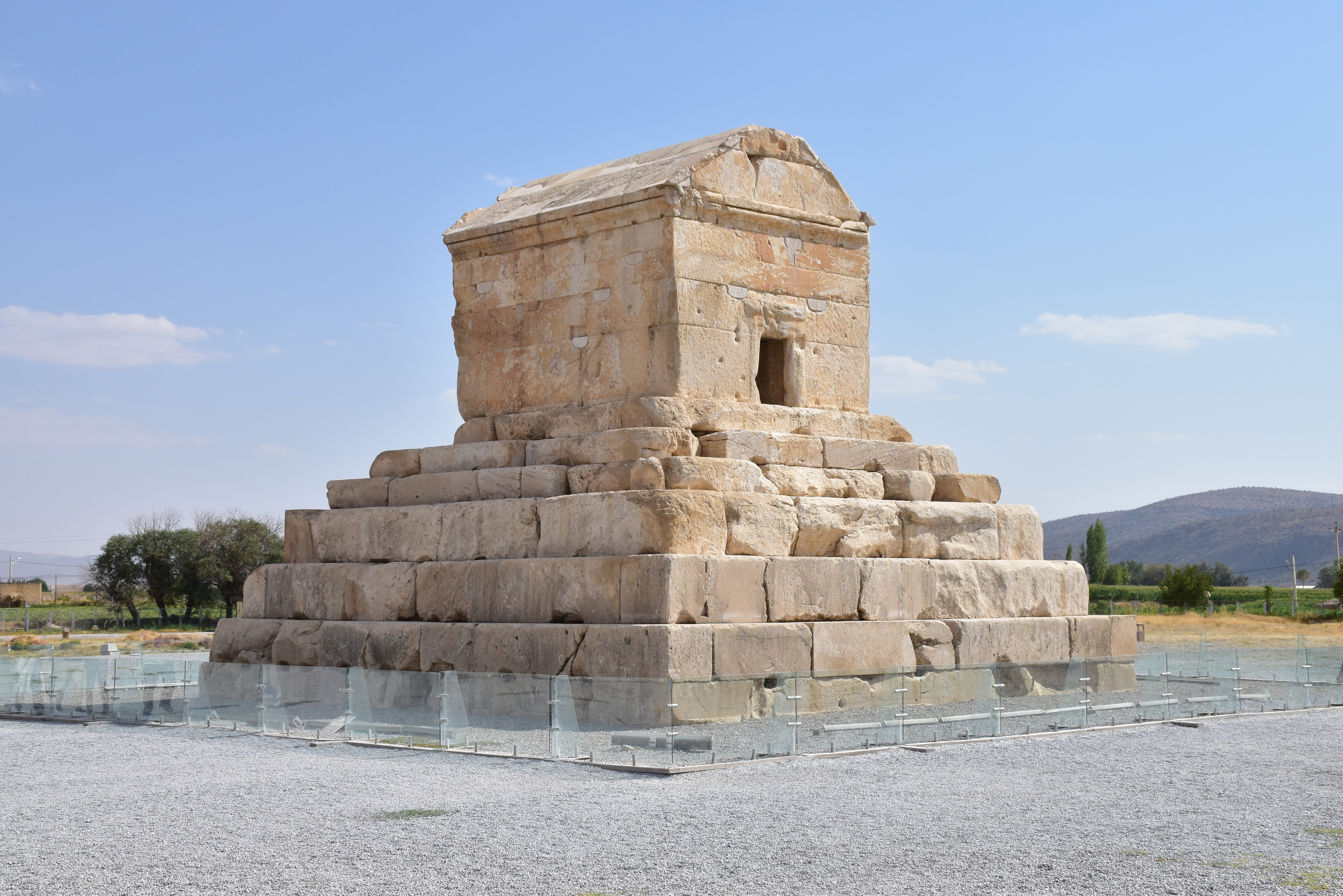

- Location within Iran
- 30°11′38″N 53°10′02″E
- Location: Pasargadae, Iran

History
- Built: 6th century BC
- Built for: Cyrus the Great

Site notes
- Architectural style: Achaemenid
- Restored: 1970–1971 (first); 2003–2008 (second); 2024–present (third)

The tomb of Cyrus the Great is located in Pasargadae, which was the first capital city of his Achaemenid Empire and is now an archaeological site in the Fars province of Iran.

The mausoleum is a significant historical example of earthquake engineering as it is said to be the oldest base-isolated structure in the world, allowing it great resilience against seismic hazards. It is one of the key Iranian UNESCO World Heritage Sites, as part of the archaeological site of Pasargadae.

== Identification ==
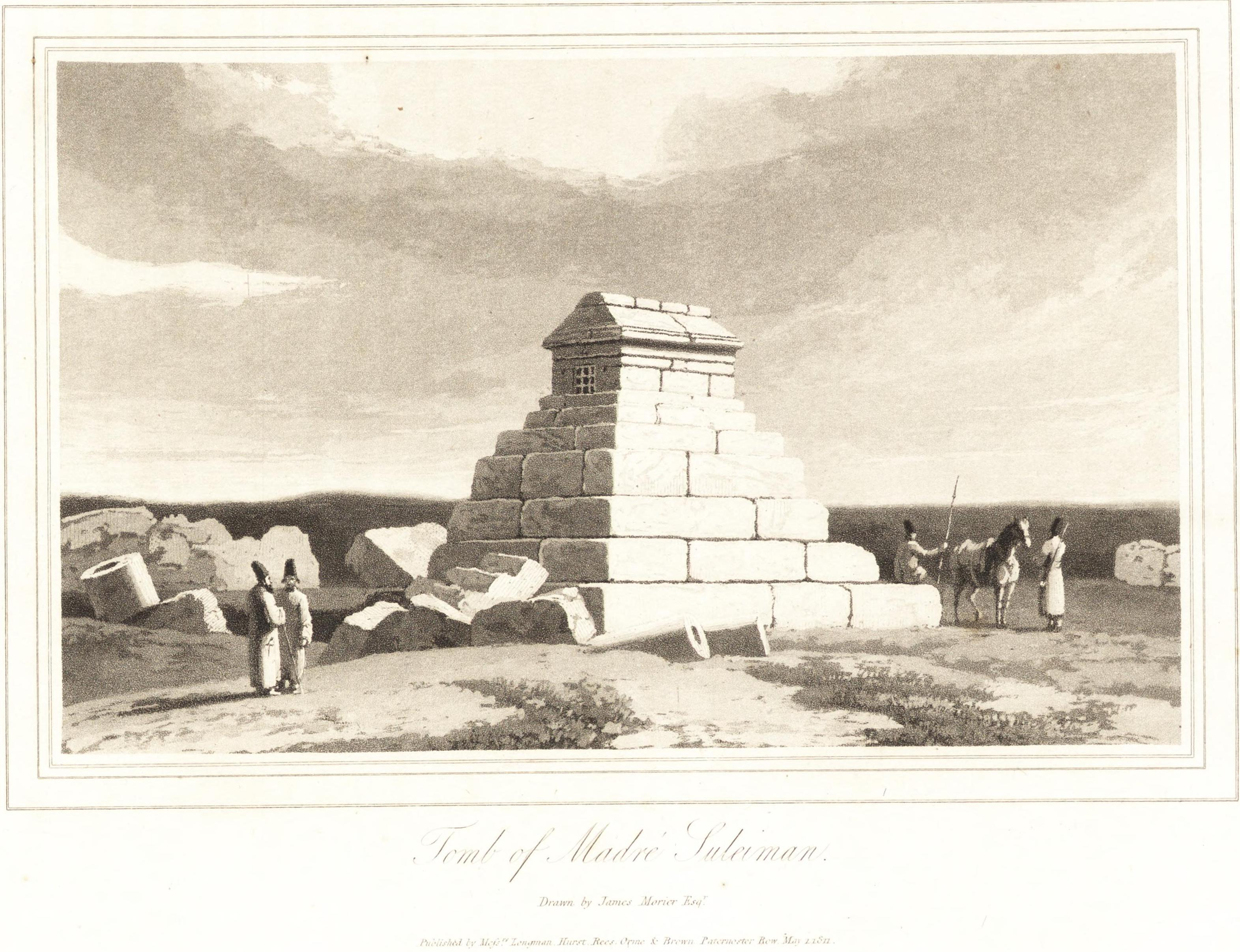
The first modern depiction of the tomb, published by James Justinian Morier in 1811, entitled the "Tomb of Madre Suleiman"

Prior to being identified with Cyrus the Great by the British diplomat James Justinian Morier in 1812, it was attributed to a certain "Mother of Solomon" in legendary accounts that had emerged at some point after the Muslim conquest of Persia; Morier's understanding, drawing upon the works of the German traveller Johan Albrecht de Mandelslo, was that it referred to Wallada bint al-Abbas ibn al-Jaz, who was the mother of Sulayman ibn Abd al-Malik (r. 715–717) of the Umayyad Caliphate. Similar beliefs suggested to the Venetian explorer Giosafat Barbaro in the 15th century asserted that it was the resting place of Bathsheba, who was the mother of Solomon (r. 970–931 BCE) of the United Kingdom of Israel. It was also later identified by Johan Albrecht de Mandelslo.

It was first identified as the Tomb of Cyrus in the early nineteenth century, first in 1812 by James Justinian Morier and then in 1821 by Robert Ker Porter.

Morier described the tomb as follows:

[It] is a building of a form so extraordinary that the people of the country often call it the court of the deevis or devil. It rests upon a square base of large blocks of marble, which rise in seven layers pyramidically... On every part of the monument itself are carved inscriptions, which attest the reverence of its visitors; but there is no vestige of any of the characters of ancient Persia or even of the older Arabic. The key is kept by women, and none but females are permitted to enter. The people generally regard it as the monument of the mother of Solomon, and still connect some efficacy with the name; for they point out near the spot a certain water to which those who may have received the bite of a mad dog resort, and by which, if drank within thirty days, the evil effects of the wound are obviated. In eastern story almost every thing wonderful is attached to the Solomon of Scripture: the King however, to whose mother this tomb is said to be raised, is less incredibly, (as the Carmelites of Shiraz suggested to Mandelsloe), Shah Soleiman, the fourteenth Caliph of the race of Ali. But though this supposition is more probable than that it is the monument of Bathsheba, it is not to my mind satisfactory, as it differs totally from all the tombs of Mahomedan saints which I have ever seen in Persia, Asia Minor, or Turkey.

Morier ultimately dismissed the tomb's contemporary associations as fallacious, noting that its architecture and atmosphere differed from the Muslim tombs throughout Iran and aligned instead with the descriptions found in the writings of the Greek historian Arrian. He noted the similarities as well as the differences, including the lack of the inscription noted by Arrian, the lack of a grove of trees, and the triangular roof against Arrian's "arched" description:

If the position of the place had corresponded with the site of Passagardae as well as the form of this structure accords with the description of the tomb of Cyrus near that city, I should have been tempted to assign to the present building so illustrious an origin. That tomb was raised in a grove; it was a small edifice covered with an arched roof of stone, and its entrance was so narrow that the slenderest man could scarcely pass through: it rested on a quadrangular base of a single stone, and contained the celebrated inscription, "mortals, I am Cyrus, son of Cambyses, founder of the Persian monarchy, and Sovereign of Asia, grudge me not therefore this monument". That the plain around Mesjed Madre Suleiman was the site of a great city, is proved by the ruins with which it is strewed; and that this city was of the same general antiquity as Persepolis may be inferred from the existence of a similar character in the inscriptions on the remains of both, though this particular edifice does not happen to display that internal evidence of a contemporaneous date. A grove would naturally have disappeared in modern Persia; the structures correspond in size; the triangular roof of that which I visited might be called arched in an age when the true semi-circular arch was probably unknown; the door was so narrow, that, if I had been allowed to make the attempt, I could scarcely have forced myself through it; and those who kept the key affirmed that the only object within was an immense stone, which might be "the base of a single piece" described by Arrian; but as he was repeating the account of another, the difference is of little consequence, if it exists. I suspect however, as many of the buildings at Persepolis are so put together that they might once have seemed one vast block, that the present structure might also at one time have possessed a similar appearance. The eternity of his monument indeed, which Cyrus contemplated by fixing it on one enormous stone, would be equally attained by the construction of this fabric, which seems destined to survive the revolutions of ages. And in the lapse of two thousand four hundred years, the absence of an inscription on Mesjed Madre Suleiman would not be a decisive evidence against its identity with the tomb of Cyrus.

The Scottish traveller Robert Ker Porter later came to the same conclusion in 1821.

== Building specifications ==
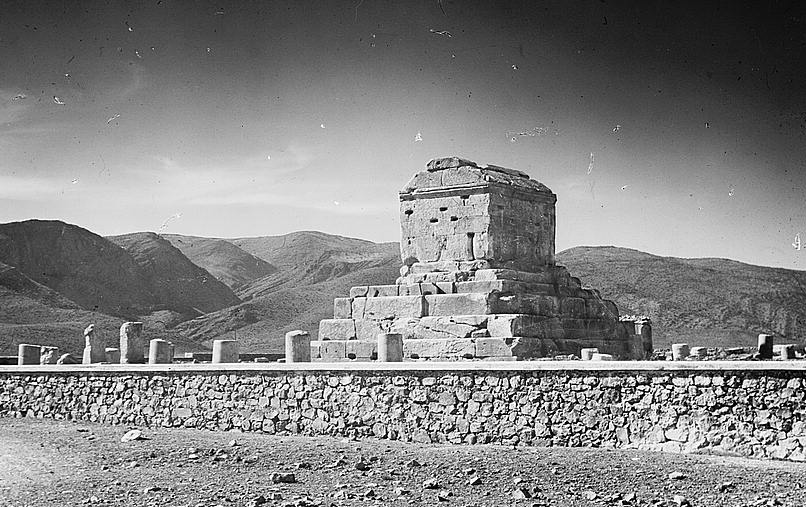
The tomb in 1943, before its renovation.

The tomb of Cyrus is located in the southern corner of the site, which was once the royal park of Pasargadae and is built of yellowish-white limestone, probably from the Sivand mine. The tomb building has been resistant to natural and unnatural factors for 2,500 years and is still standing in Pasargad plain. Its main base or foundation is a stone platform whose design forms a rectangular square with a length of 13.35 m (43.8 ft) and a width of 12.3 m (40 ft). This building consists of two completely separate parts: a six-step stone platform, and a room with a gabled roof over the sixth step.

The total height of the building is a little over 11 m (36 ft). The first platform, which forms the first step, is 1.65 m (5 ft 5 in) high, but about 60 cm (2.0 ft) of it was originally uncut and hidden; This means that like the second and third steps, it was exactly 105 cm (3 ft 5 in) high. The fourth, fifth and sixth steps are 57.5 cm (1 ft 10.6 in) high each. The width of the platforms is half a meter and the level of the sixth platform, which forms the base of the tomb room, is about 6.4 m (21 ft) by 5.35 m (17.6 ft).

The tomb room is 3.17 m (10.4 ft) long, 2.11 m (6 ft 11 in) wide, and 2.11 m (6 ft 11 in) high. Its wall is up to 1.5 m (4 ft 11 in) thick and is made of four rows of well-cut stone. The first and second rows are taller than the third and fourth rows, and on the northwest side there was apparently a double door that opened slidingly, which is now gone. The current entrance is 78 cm (2 ft 7 in) wide and 140 cm (4 ft 7 in) high, and its threshold is deep. In each of the two corners of the small threshold, a recess is made for the heel of the door and horizontal grooves 16 cm (6.3 in) deep on one side and 10 cm (3.9 in) deep on the other side, so that the two lintels can be found and placed in them when opened.

At the front of the tomb room, in the upper triangle of the gate, there was a very ornate flower, of which only half, which is very weak, remains today. A European traveler named Johann Albrecht von Mandelslow saw the flower in 1638 and depicted it in a painting of the tomb of Cyrus, but it was long forgotten or otherwise interpreted, until David Stronach recovered, described, and interpreted it in 1964.

The roof of the tomb is smooth and simple on the inside, but on the outside it is gabled and its two-sided slope is in the shape of the number eight. The roof is made of two precious stones, on which is a pyramid stone with a base of 6.25 m (20.5 ft) meters by 3 m (9.8 ft) and a thickness of 50 cm (1 ft 8 in), and on it, there was a stone above the roof, which is not available now. It is believed that according to the Achaemenid tradition, in order to lighten and better move the precious stones, they dug inside the roof. Forsat al-Dawla Shirazi had noticed the empty space between the inner roof and the sloping roof outside and considered it a burial place for the dead:

Its roof is sloping on the outside but flat on the inside; Therefore, from the back of this flat roof inside to below the concave roof, it is hollow [= empty] in the shape of a triangle, and there was a burial place of the dead, and in the past the roof was pierced and its stones were broken. Some of the people who went up from there saw the crypt, where it was mentioned that a coffin was made of stone and the dead man was in it. The corpse is now like scattered dust.

This middle part, mentioned by Shirazi, is a hollow 4.75 m (15.6 ft) long, which is about 1 m (3 ft 3 in) wide and 85 cm (2 ft 9 in) deep. In order not to shake the endurance of this pit, the roof was made in two pieces. However, the idea that the empty space was the location of the coffin or even two coffins (due to the division of the middle space into two) has been popular in the past.

The floor of the tomb room is made of two large stone slabs. According to George Curzon (1892), the slate was larger than the large holes in which it was dug. Probably to find out what is under it.

The mausoleum was built without mortar, but the metal bundles of the mounds connected the stones, almost all of which had been dug up and removed, leaving unpleasant dimples that damaged the building's strength. A team led by Alireza Shapour Shahbazi repaired these ditches as much as possible with the pieces they had brought from the Sivand mine.

Those who visited the tomb in the nineteenth century and recorded their observations spoke of the distant pillars of the tomb of Cyrus. There is currently no trace of these columns and other structures around the tomb. For example, Franz Heinrich Weisbach, a German scholar and orientalist who visited Pasargadae in the late nineteenth century and wrote a description of the buildings in Pasargadae, describes the pillars around the tomb of Cyrus as follows:

The three sides of the tomb are surrounded by 22 columns. Traces can be seen from the double-walled wall that surrounds the columns. The length of each row of columns facing each other is 30 m (33 yd) and the length of the row of columns perpendicular to these two rows is 32 m (35 yd). The length of the two opposite rows from the inner wall is 35 m (38 yd) and the length of the other part from the inner wall is 42 m (46 yd). There is doubt that the outer wall existed from the beginning. The outer wall is a huge wall on which the remains of a gate rest.

Decades before Weisbach, Kerr Porter, who visited the tomb in 1818, expressed his views on the condition of the columns:

A large area, defined by a base of 24 round pillars, encloses the building like a square. The diameter of each column is 99 cm (3 ft 3 in). Each side of the square is completed by 6 columns, each of which is 4.27 m (14.0 ft) from the side column. The 17 pillars are still standing, but they are surrounded by rubbish, and are deliberately connected by a mud wall.

Different opinions have been expressed about the origin of the architectural style of the building. The range of these views is wide and includes the Greek origin of Asia Minor, the Mediterranean, the Egyptians, the Elamites, and the original Iranians. B. Faravash coverage Khrpshthay the tomb of Cyrus wrote that the graves Ryayyany the first silk are likewise covered, and this leads still the first king of the Achaemenid tombs along, according to tradition and so in areas Barankhyz north of Iran usual, made.

== Reconstruction of the tomb ==
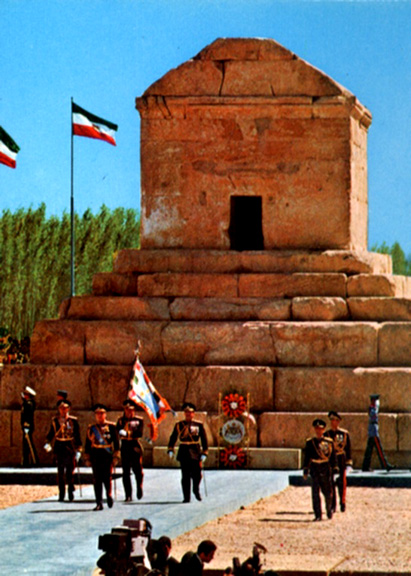
Tomb of Cyrus at Pasargadae, where the festivities started

The tomb was renovated twice, once in preparation for the 2,500-year celebration of the Persian Empire in 1971 and the second time between 2002 and 2009.

== Classical accounts ==
The most extensive description of the structure, based on a lost account by Aristobulus (who had accompanied Alexander the Great on his eastern campaigns in the late fourth century BC), is to be found in The Anabasis of Alexander (6.29), written by Arrian in the second century AD.

Arrian, writing in the second century AD, described the tomb as follows:

He was grieved by the outrage committed upon the tomb of Cyrus, son of Cambyses; for according to Aristobulus, he found it dug through and pillaged. The tomb of the famous Cyrus was in the royal park at Pasargadae, and around it a grove of all kinds of trees had been planted. The park was also watered by a stream, and high grass grew in the meadow. The base of the tomb itself had been made of squared stone in the form of a rectangle. Above it there was a stone building surmounted by a roof, with a door leading within, so narrow that even a small man could with difficulty enter, after suffering much discomfort. In the building lay a golden coffin, in which the body of Cyrus had been buried, and by the side of the coffin was a couch, the feet of which were of gold wrought with the hammer. A carpet of Babylonian tapestry with purple rugs formed the bedding; upon it were also a Median coat with sleeves and other tunics of Babylonian manufacture. Aristobulus adds that Median trousers and robes dyed the colour of hyacinth were also lying upon it, as well as others of purple and various other colours; moreover there were collars, sabres, and earrings of gold and precious stones soldered together, and near them stood a table. On the middle of the couch lay the coffin which contained the body of Cyrus. Within the inclosure, near the ascent leading to the tomb, there was a small house built for the Magians who guarded the tomb; a duty which they had discharged ever since the time of Cambyses, son of Cyrus, son succeeding father as guard. To these men a sheep and specified quantities of wheaten flour and wine were given daily by the king; and a horse once a month as a sacrifice to Cyrus. Upon the tomb an inscription in Persian letters had been placed, which bore the following meaning in the Persian language: "O man, I am Cyrus, son of Cambyses, who founded the empire of the Persians, and was king of Asia. Do not therefore grudge me this monument." As soon as Alexander had conquered Persia, he was very desirous of entering the tomb of Cyrus; but he found that everything else had been carried off except the coffin and couch.

Strabo stated that when Alexander the Great looted and destroyed Persepolis, he paid a visit to the tomb of Cyrus and commanded Aristobulus, one of his warriors, to enter the monument. Inside he found a golden bed, a table set with drinking vessels, a gold coffin, some ornaments studded with precious stones and an inscription on the tomb. No trace of any such inscription survives. Strabo described it as follows:

Alexander then went to Pasargadae; and this too was an ancient royal residence. Here he saw also, in a park, the tomb of Cyrus; it was a small tower and was concealed within the dense growth of trees. The tomb was solid below, but had a roof and sepulchre above, which latter had an extremely narrow entrance. Aristobulus says that at the behest of the king he passed through this entrance and decorated the tomb; and that he saw a golden couch, a table with cups, a golden coffin, and numerous garments and ornaments set with precious stones; and that he saw all these things on his first visit, but that on a later visit the place had been robbed and everything had been carried off except the couch and the coffin, which had only been broken to pieces, and that the robbers had removed the corpse to another place, a fact which plainly proved that it was an act of plunderers, not of the satrap, since they left behind only what could not easily be carried off; and that the robbery took place even though the tomb was surrounded by a guard of Magi, who received for their maintenance a sheep every day and a horse every month. But just as the remoteness of the countries to which Alexander's army advanced, Bactra and India, had led to numerous other revolutionary acts, so too this was one of the revolutionary acts. Now Aristobulus so states it, and he goes to record the following inscription on the tomb: "O man, I am Cyrus, who acquired the empire for the Persians and was king of Asia; grudge me not, therefore, my monument." Onesicritus, however, states that the tower had ten stories and that Cyrus lay in the uppermost story, and that there was one inscription in Greek, carved in Persian letters, "Here I lie, Cyrus, king of kings," and another written in the Persian language with the same meaning.

Arrian relates that following the desecration of the tomb, Alexander interrogated the Magi guard to learn who was responsible, but they pleaded ignorance. Alexander then ordered the tomb restored to its prior state, with all the grave-goods repaired or replaced; thereafter the entrance of the tomb was sealed to prevent further vandalism.

== Architecture ==
The design of Cyrus's tomb is credited to Mesopotamian or Elamite ziggurats, but the cella is usually attributed to Urartu tombs of an earlier period. In particular, the tomb at Pasargadae has almost exactly the same dimensions as the tomb of Alyattes, father of the Lydian King Croesus; however, some have refused the claim (according to Herodotus, Croesus was spared by Cyrus during the conquest of Lydia, and became a member of Cyrus's court). The main decoration on the tomb is a rosette design over the door within the gable.

== Cyrus the Great Day ==
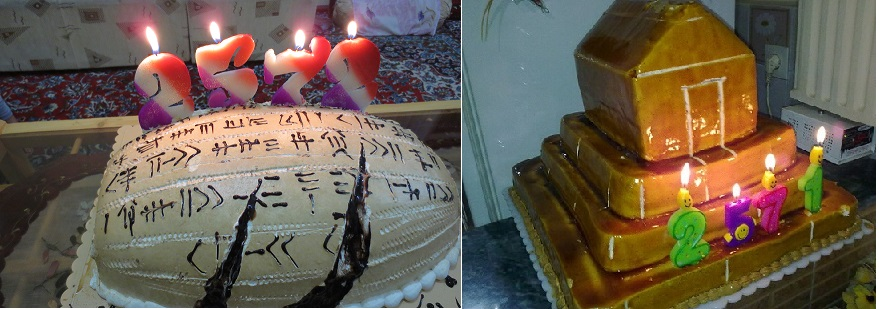
A cake in the shape of the Cyrus Cylinder and a cake in the shape of the Tomb of Cyrus at Pasargadae

Cyrus the Great Day (Persian: روز کوروش بزرگ ruz-e kuroš-e bozorg), also simply known as Cyrus Day (Persian:روز کوروش ruz-e kuroš), is an unofficial holiday in Iran that takes place annually on 29 October, 7 Aban on the Iranian calendar, to commemorate Cyrus the Great. That is the anniversary of the entrance of Cyrus into Babylon. Cyrus is founder of the first Persian Empire also known as the Achaemenid Empire.

== Similar buildings and structures ==
It seems that a building like the tomb of Cyrus did not exist before it was built, either in Iran or abroad, although structures looking alike were built later.

Gur-e-Dokhtar, located at Central District of Dashtestan County, Bushehr province is one of historical monuments from Achaemenid era that looks very similar to Cyrus's tomb. Alireza Shapour Shahbazi suggests that this monument might be the tomb of Cyrus the Younger.

There is also a very similar building to Cyrus's tomb in Taş Kule, Phocaea, which was probably built when Lydia was an Achaemenid satrap and was probably for a great Persian or Lydian person.

== Persian New Year ==
During Nowruz, the Persian New Year, celebrations are held annually around the tomb by Iranians which gather from all around the country. Iranians respect Cyrus the Great as the founder of Iran and the Persian Empire.

== Gallery ==
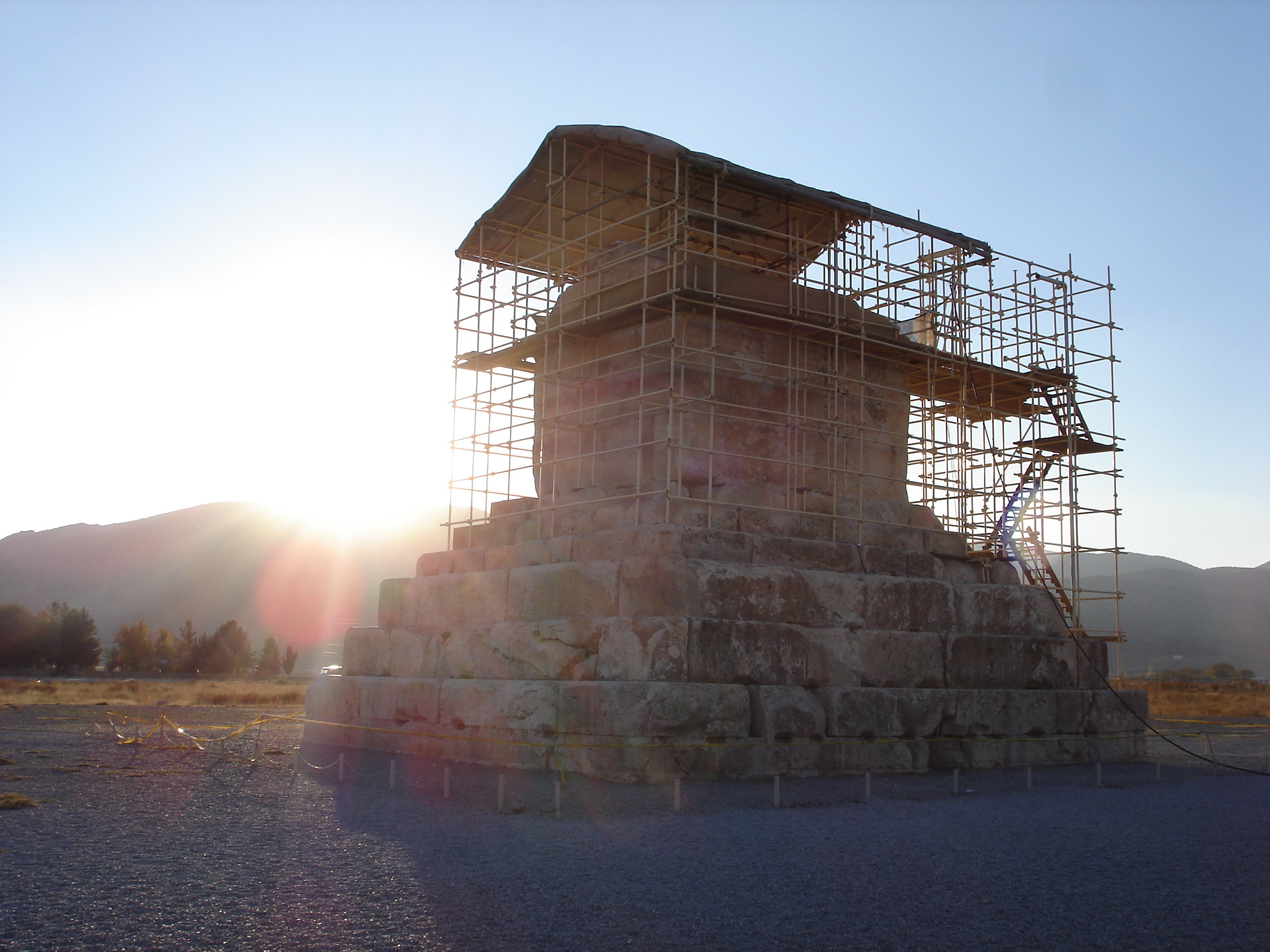
Tomb of Cyrus under restoration.

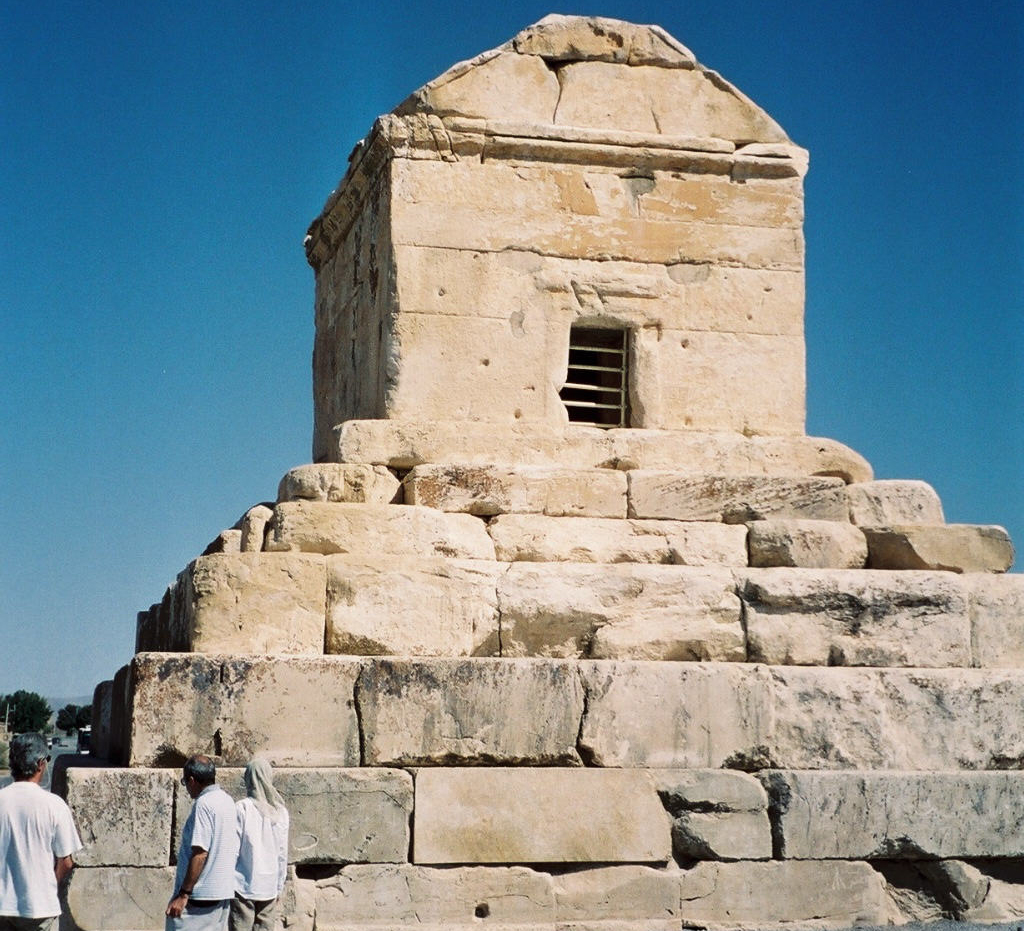
Mausoleum of Cyrus the Great in Iran.

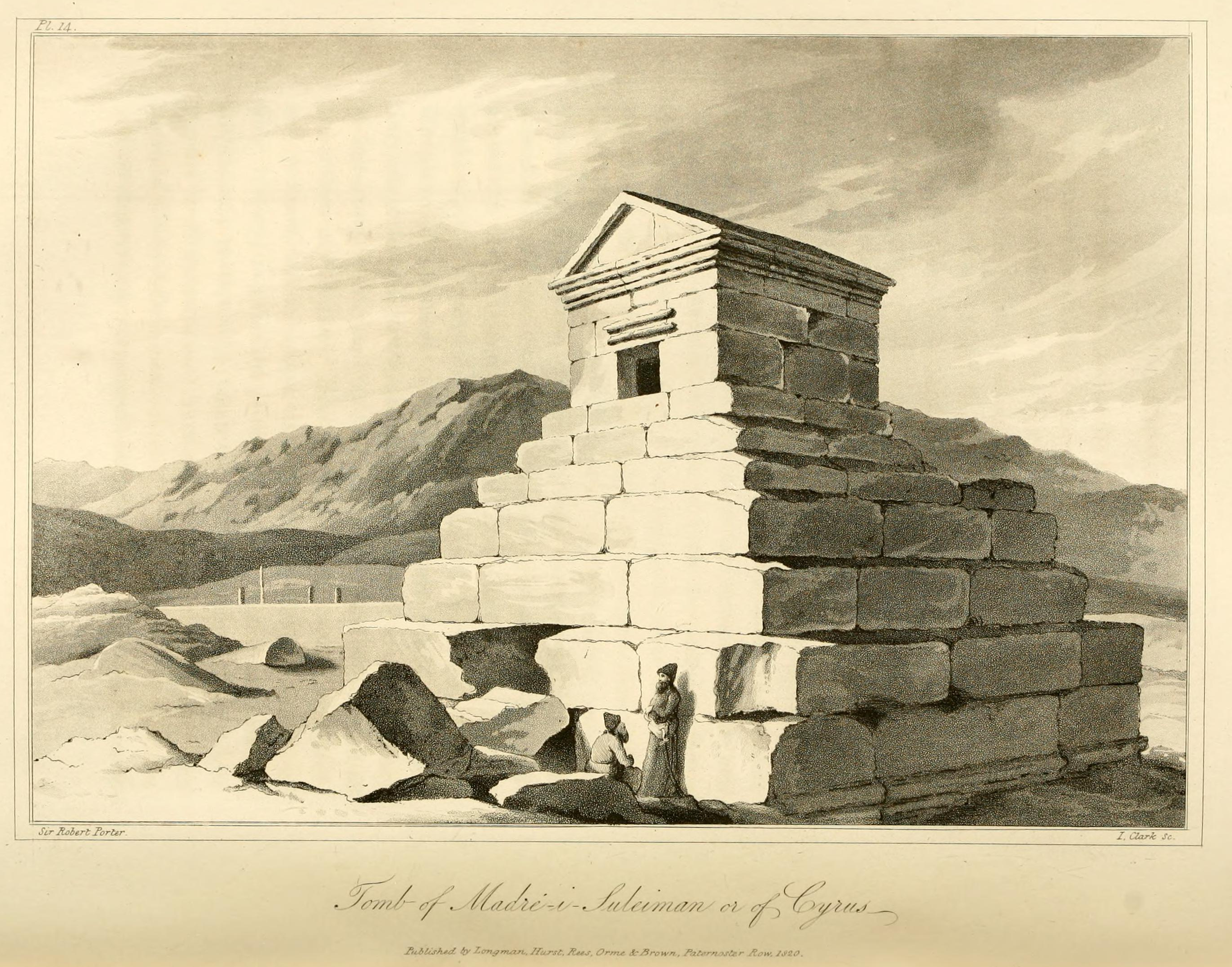
By Robert Ker Porter, 1818

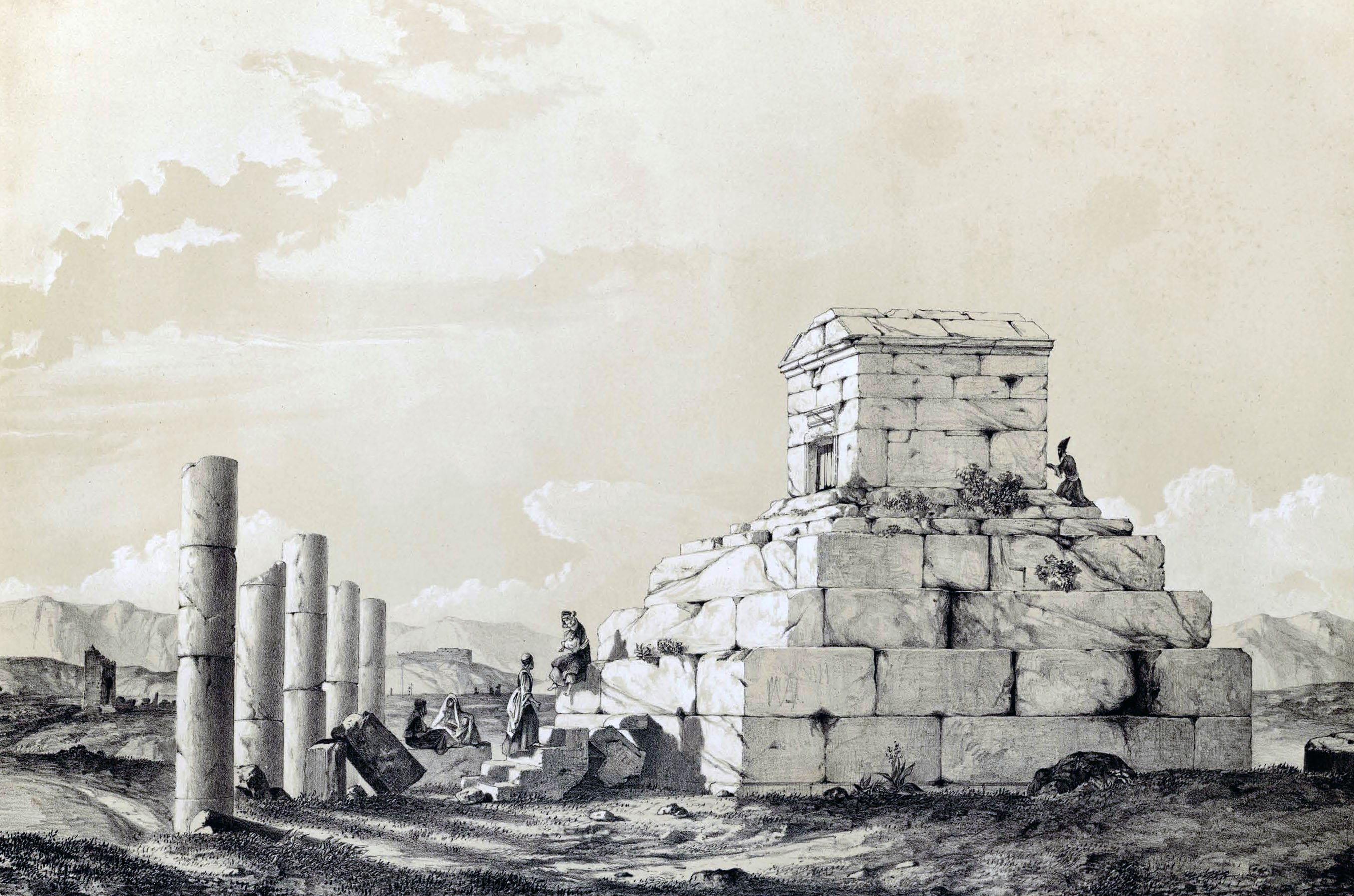
Passargade by Eugène Flandin, 1840

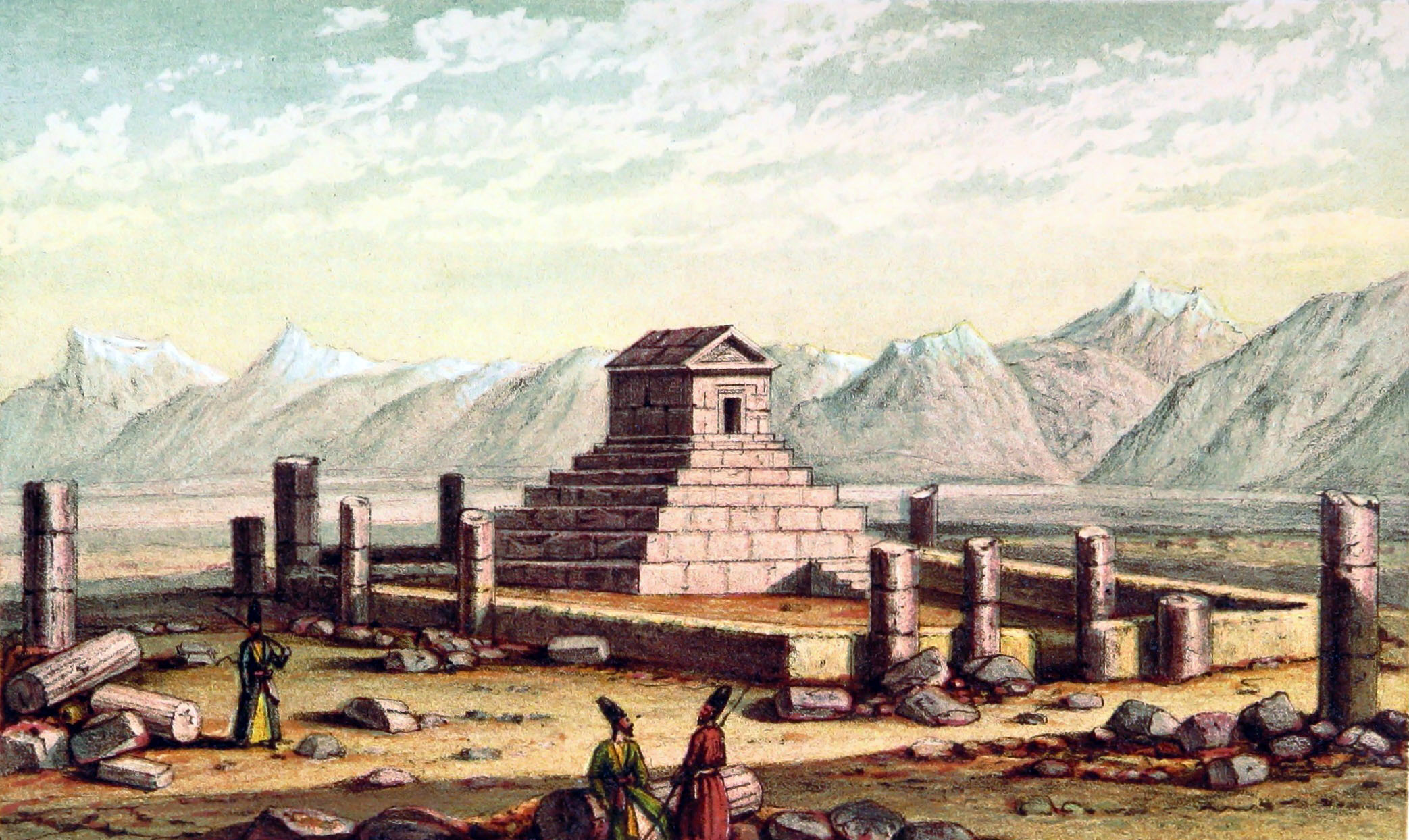
John Ussher, 1865

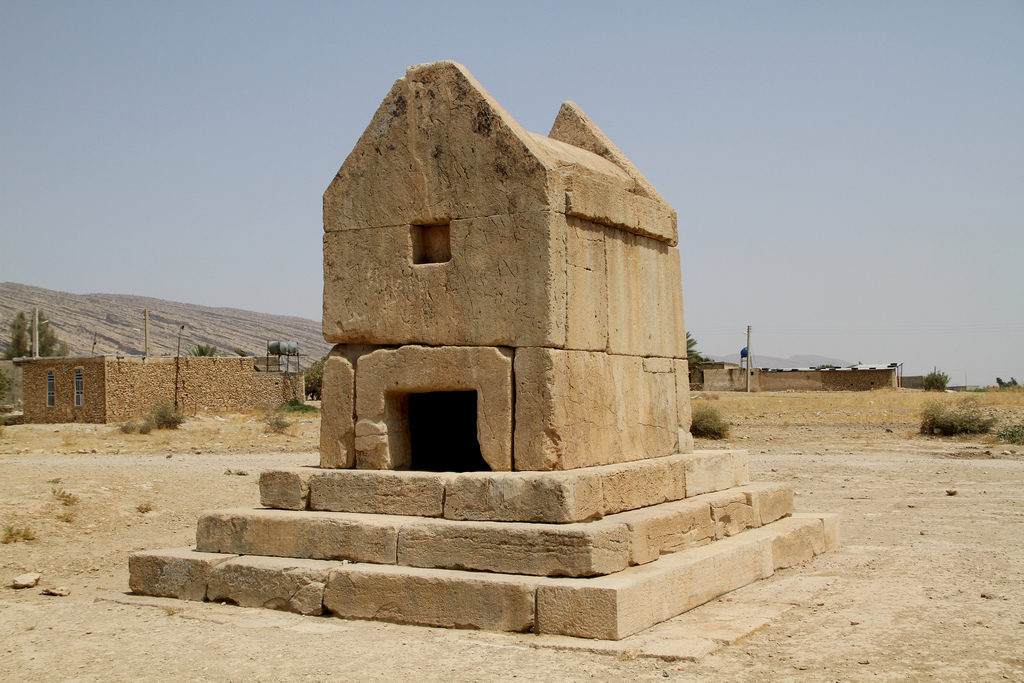
Gur-e-Dokhtar, possible tomb of Cyrus I

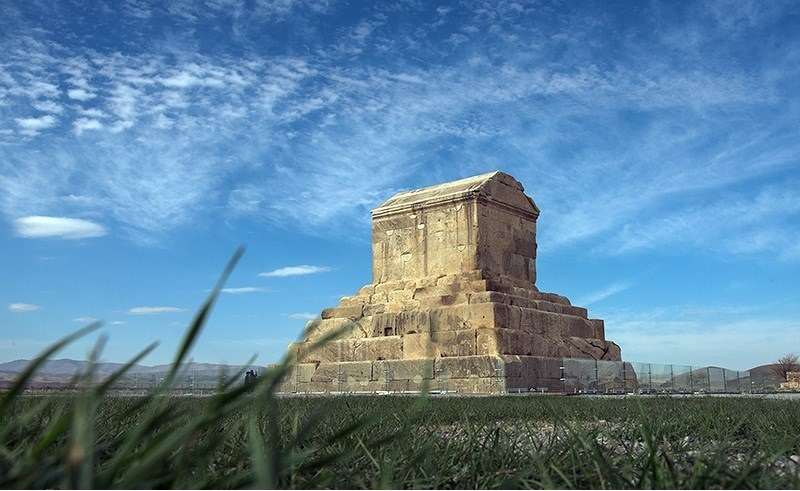
Tomb of Cyrus the Great

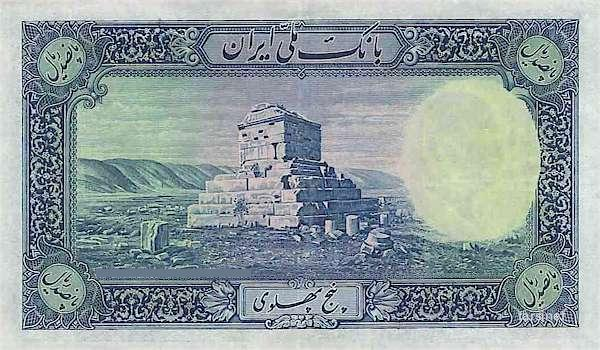
Backside view of the Tomb of Cyrus the Great on the reverse of a 1938 500 Rials banknote.

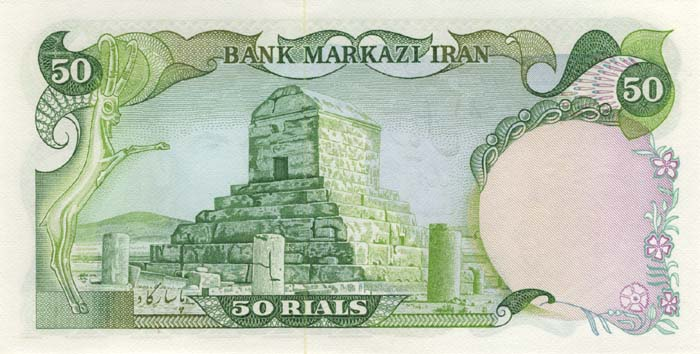
Frontside view of the Tomb of Cyrus the Great on the reverse of a 1970s 50 Rials banknote.

== See also ==
- Gur-e-Dokhtar
- 2016 Cyrus the Great Revolt

== Sources ==
- R.M.Ghias Abadi (2004) Achaemenid Inscriptions, 2nd edition, publisher Shiraz Navid ISBN 964-358-015-6
- Amelie Kuhrt (1995) The Ancient Near East: ca. 3000-330 BC, chapter 13, p. 647, Routledge ISBN 0-415-16762-0
- Arrian, Anabasis I. IX; cf. M. A. Dandamaev Cyrus II, within Encyclopaedia Iranica
- Dusinberre, Elspeth R. M (2003). Aspects of empire in Achaemenid Sardis. Cambridge University Press. ISBN 978-0-521-81071-5.
