= Robert Ker Porter =

British artist, writer and diplomat

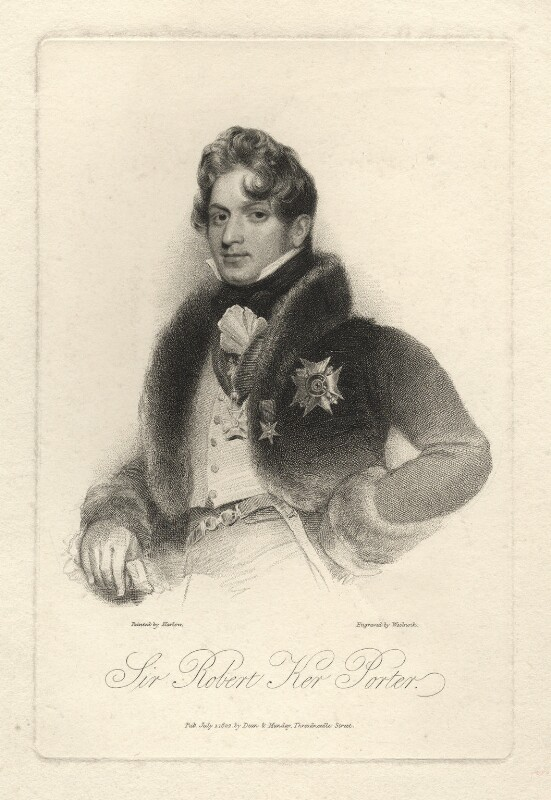
Self-portrait of Porter

Sir Robert Ker Porter, KCH (1777 – 4 May 1842) was a British artist, writer and diplomat. Known today for his accounts of his travels in Russia, Spain, Portugal and Persia, he was one of the earliest panorama painters in Britain, was appointed historical painter to Tsar Alexander I of Russia and served as British consul in Venezuela.

== Early life ==
Porter was born in Durham, England in 1777, one of the five children of the Scotsman William Porter, an army surgeon. His sisters were the writers Jane Porter and Anna Maria Porter. His father died in 1779, and the following year his mother took him to Edinburgh, although he attended Durham School. He decided that he wanted to become a painter of battle scenes, and in 1790 his mother took him to see Benjamin West, who thought enough of his sketches to procure him admission as a student at the Royal Academy. In 1792 he received a silver palette from the Society of Arts for a drawing entitled The Witch of Endor. In 1793, he was commissioned to paint an altarpiece for Shoreditch church; in 1794 he painted Christ allaying the Storm for the Roman Catholic chapel at Portsea, Portsmouth; and in 1798 St. John Preaching for St John's College, Cambridge.

== Panoramas and historical paintings ==
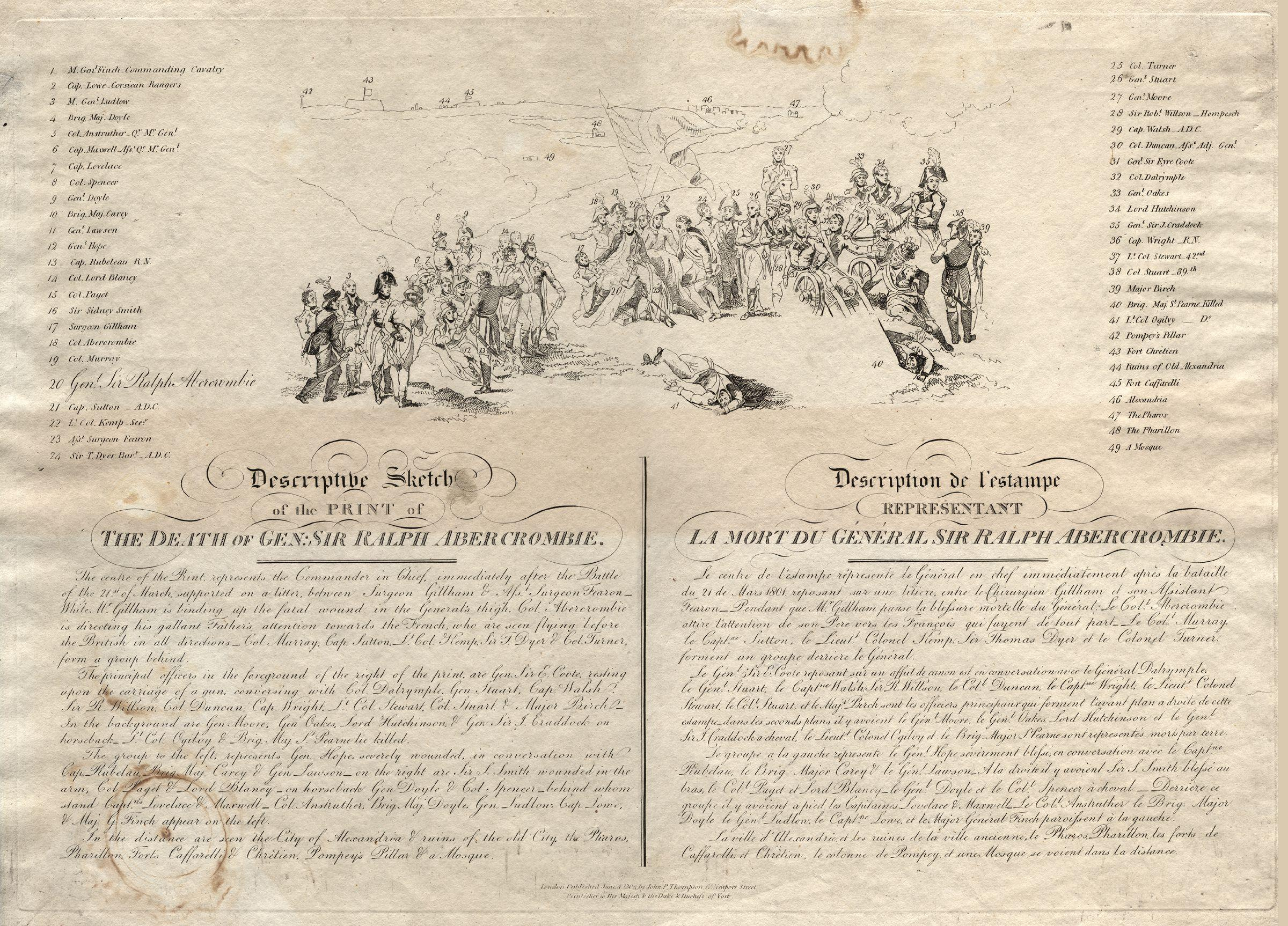
Descriptive sketch of Sir Ralph Abercromby's death by Porter

In 1800, he obtained work as a scene-painter at the Lyceum Theatre, and in the same year caused a sensation when his Storming of Seringapatam, a panorama 120 feet (37 m) long, carried round three-quarters of a circle, was exhibited at the Lyceum. It was painted, according to his sister Jane, in six weeks. Other successful works in the same format were the Battle of Lodi (1803), also exhibited at the Lyceum, and the Defeat of the French at the Devil's Bridge, Mont St. Gothard, by Suwarrow in 1804. He also showed several pictures at the Royal Academy including Death of Sir Philip Sydney in 1792, The Defeat of King Stephen at the Battle of Lincoln in 1793, and the Battle of Northampton in 1796.

== Russia, Spain, Caucasus and Persia ==
In 1804 Porter was appointed historical painter to Tsar Alexander I of Russia. In St Petersburg he was employed upon some vast historical paintings for the Admiralty Hall. During his residence in the city he won the affections of a Russian princess, Mary, daughter of Prince Theodor von Scherbatoff, but complications connected with their courtship necessitated his leaving Russia, whereupon he travelled in Finland and Sweden, where he was knighted by King Gustav IV Adolf in 1806. He then visited several German courts, and in 1807 was created a knight of St Joachim of Würtemberg.

While in Sweden, Porter had got to know General Sir John Moore, whom he accompanied to Spain. He was with the military expedition throughout, was present at the Battle of Coruña and the death of the general, and made many sketches of the campaign. In the meantime his Travelling Sketches in Russia and Sweden during the years 1805–1808 had appeared in 1809, elaborately illustrated by the author. It was soon followed by Letters from Portugal and Spain, written during the march of the troops under Sir John Moore. In 1811 he returned to Russia, and on 7 February 1812 he married his Russian princess (who was to die of typhus at St Petersburg in September 1826). He mixed in Russian military and diplomatic circles, and became well acquainted with the Russian version of the events of 1812–13, of which he gave an account in his Narrative of the Campaign in Russia during 1812.

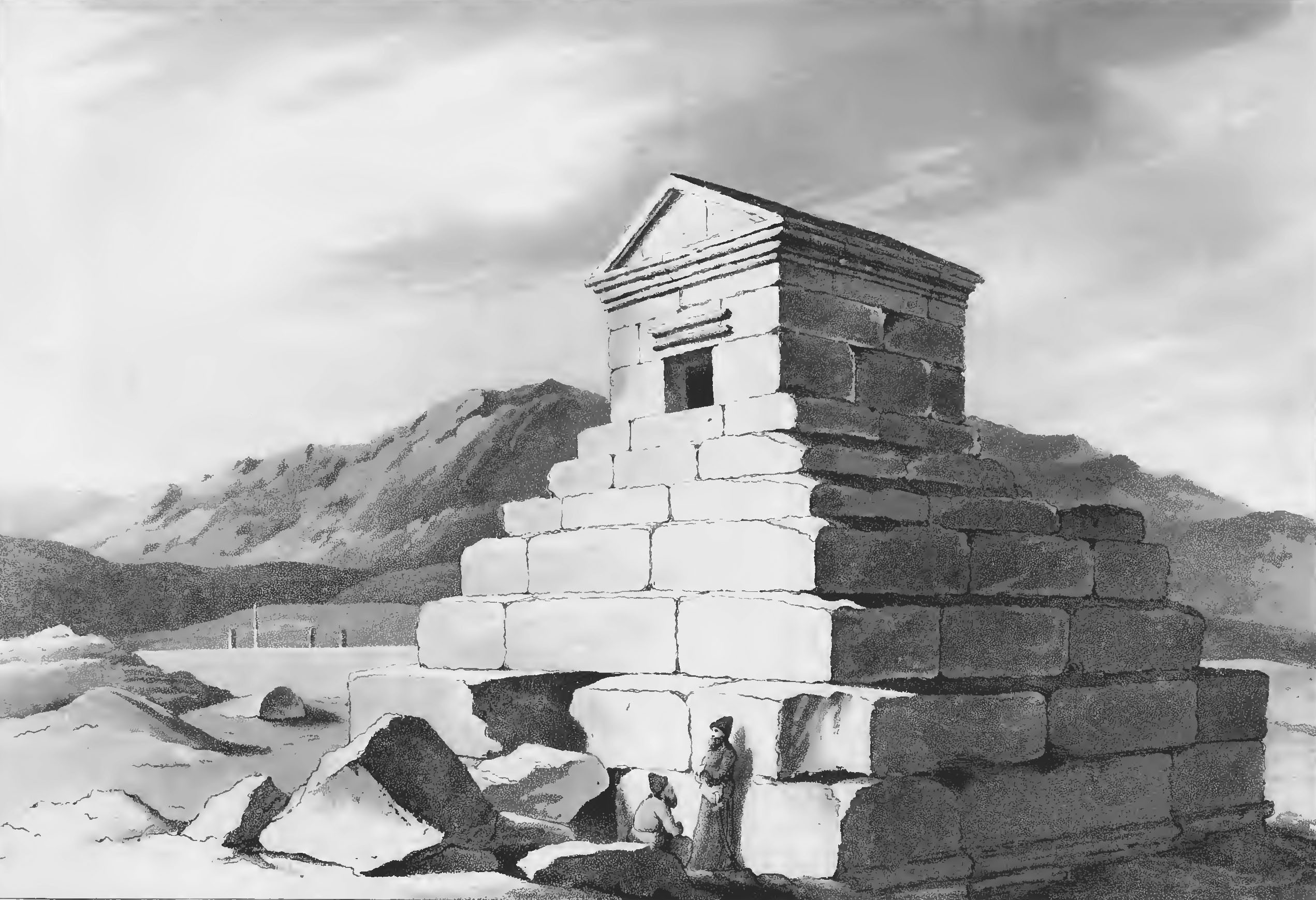
1818 drawing of the tomb of Cyrus the Great by Porter

Porter had returned to England before the appearance of this book, and on 2 April 1813 he was knighted by the Prince Regent. He was soon abroad again, and in August 1817 he left from St Petersburg on a long journey which took him through the Caucasus to Tehran, and then southwards via Isfahan to the site of the ancient Persepolis, where he made drawings and transcribed a number of cuneiform inscriptions. After a stay at Shiraz, he returned to Isfahan, and proceeded to Ecbatana and Baghdad, and then, following the route of Xenophon's Katabasis, to Scutari. He was the first person to locate the tomb of Cyrus the Great in Pasargadae near Shiraz. He published an account of his journey in Travels in Georgia, Persia, Armenia, Ancient Babylonia, 1817–1820. At Tehran, he had an audience with the Persian monarch Fath-Ali Shah Qajar, whose portrait he drew, and from whom in 1819 he received the Order of the Lion and the Sun.

== Venezuela ==
After returning to England, he soon left again for Russia, but in 1826 he was appointed British consul in Venezuela, a position he held for fifteen years. He continued to paint during this period, his works including several large religious pieces, and a portrait of Simón Bolívar.

== Return to Europe ==
He returned to England in 1841. After a short stay with his brother at Bristol, he went to visit his daughter, who had married a Russian army officer, in St Petersburg. On 3 May 1842 he wrote from St Petersburg to his brother that he was about to sail for England, but died suddenly the next day as he was returning in his droshky (carriage) from a farewell visit to Emperor Nicholas I. He was buried in St Petersburg, and a monument was erected to his memory in Bristol Cathedral.

== Writings ==
- Porter, Robert Ker (1809). Letters from Portugal and Spain written during the march of the troops under Sir John Moore. London: Hurst, Rees, and Orme.
- Porter, Robert Ker (1809). Travelling sketches in Russia and Sweden during the years 1805, 1806, 1807, 1808. Philadelphia: Hopkins and Earle.
- Porter, Robert Ker (1810?). The costume of the inhabitants of Russia. London: J. Edington.
- Porter, Robert Ker (1815). A narrative of the campaign in Russia during the year 1812. By Sir Robert Ker Porter. Hartford: Andrus and Starr.
- Porter, Robert Ker (1821–22). Travels in Georgia, Persia, Armenia, ancient Babylonia, &c. &c. During the years 1817, 1818, 1819, and 1820. London: Longman, Hurst, Rees, Orme and Brown.
- Porter, Robert Ker (1825–42). Sir Robert Ker Porter's Caracas Diary, 1825–1842: A British Diplomat in a Newborn Nation. Edited by Walter Dupouy. Caracas: Editorial Arte, 1966.

== Sources ==
- Harrington, Peter (1993). British Artists and War: The Face of Battle in Paintings and Prints, 1700–1914. London: Greenhill
- Sir Robert Ker Porter's Caracas Diary, 1825–1842: A British Diplomat in a Newborn Nation. Edited by Walter Dupouy. Caracas: Editorial Arte, 1966.
- Novik, Alina. Panorama as a Form of Historical Painting: Towards the History of the Russian Exposition of R. K. Porter's Panorama “The Defeat of the French by Suvorov”. In: Actual Problems of Theory and History of Art: Collection of articles. Vol. 10. Eds: A. V. Zakharova, S. V. Maltseva, E. Iu. Staniukovich-Denisova. Moscow, Lomonosov Moscow State University; St. Petersburg, NP-Print, 2020, pp. 373–350. (in Russian).

Attribution

- This article incorporates text from a publication now in the public domain: Seccombe, Thomas (1885–1900). "Porter, Robert Ker" . Dictionary of National Biography. London: Smith, Elder & Co.
