= Aban (month) =

8th month of the Solar Hijri calendar

- Native name: آبان (Persian); عقرب (Dari); Xezelwer / Gelarêzan (Kurdish); Обон / Ақраб (Tajik)
- Calendar: Solar Hijri calendar
- Month number: 8
- Number of days: 30
- Season: Autumn
- Gregorian equivalent: October-November

Aban (Persian: آبان, Persian pronunciation: [ɒːˈbɒːn]) is the eighth month of the Solar Hijri calendar, the official calendar of Iran and Afghanistan. Aban has 30 days. It begins on 23 October and ends on 21 November in the Gregorian calendar. Aban corresponds to the tropical astrological month of Scorpio.

Aban is the second month of autumn, and is followed by Azar.

The name is derived from Aban, i.e. "waters".

== Events ==
- 13 - 1190 - 1811 Independence Movement of El Salvador, the first independence revolt in Central American lands, begins.
- 19 - 1251 - Great Boston Fire of 1872
- 24 - 1268 - Proclamation of the Republic (Brazil)
- 14 - 1296 - Act of 5th November
- 16 - 1296 - October Revolution in Russia
- 5 - 1297 - Czechoslovak declaration of independence: Czech politicians take over Prague from Austro-Hungarian government officials.
- 7 - 1297 - Martin Declaration
- 19 - 1297 - Armistice of 11 November 1918 officially marks the conclusion of the First World War, Józef Piłsudski forms first Polish independent government since the Partitions of Poland
- 20 - 1321 - Naval Battle of Guadalcanal begins
- 19 - 1324 - Battle of Surabaya
- 19 - 1354 - Sinking of the SS Edmund Fitzgerald
- 27 - 1357 - Jonestown mass suicide
- 18 - 1368 - Fall of the Berlin Wall
- 18 - 1384 - 2005 Amman bombings
- 14 - 1394 - Mariana dam disaster
- 20 - 1399 - 2020 Nagorno-Karabakh ceasefire agreement formally ends the Second Nagorno-Karabakh War
- 18–20 - 1401 - Liberation of Kherson

== Deaths ==
- 14 - 1392 - Habibollah Asgaroladi, senior Iranian politician.

== Observances ==
- United Nations Day - 2 or 3 Aban
- United States Navy Day - 5 or 6 Aban
- Republic Day in Turkey - 6 or 7 Aban
- Cyrus the Great Day - 7 Aban
- Birthday of the Royal Marines and Czech Independence Day and anniversary of the foundation of Czechoslovakia - 6 or 7 Aban
- Halloween and Reformation Day - 9/10 Aban
- Abanegan - 9 Aban (Zoroastrian holiday)
- All Saints' Day - 9–10 Aban
- Guy Fawkes Night - 14–15 Aban
- October Revolution Day (former), Day of Military Honour on the anniversary of the 1941 October Revolution Parades (current) - 16 Aban
- Victory Day (Azerbaijan) - 17 Aban
- Independence Day of Cambodia - 18/19 Aban
- United States Marine Corps Birthday - 19 or 20 Aban
- Remembrance Day (Commonwealth)/Veterans Day/National Independence Day (Poland) - 20 or 21 Aban
- Republic Proclamation Day of Brazil - 24 Aban
- Proclamation Day of the Republic of Latvia - 26 or 27 Aban
- Entry of the Most Holy Theotokos into the Temple - 29/30 Aban
- Remembrance Sunday (Great Britain) - Third Sunday of Aban
- Volkstrauertag - Last Sunday of Aban
