= Cyrus the Great Day =

Unofficial holiday in Iran

Cyrus the Great Day روز کوروش بزرگ
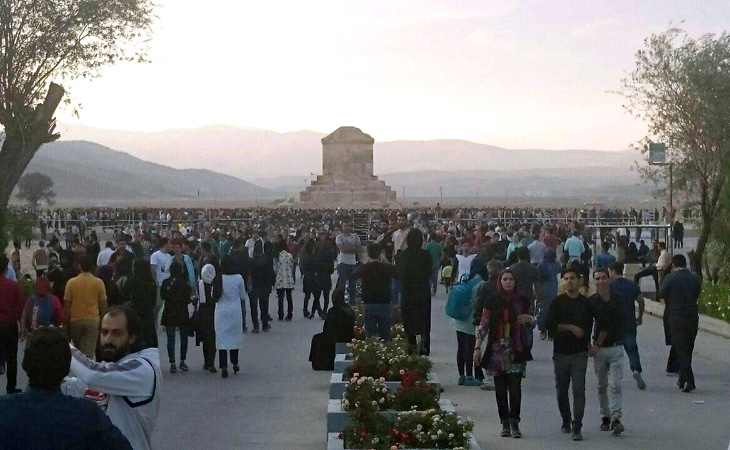
- Iranians rallying around the tomb of Cyrus the Great, 29 October 2015
- Status: Unofficial
- Genre: Nationalist
- Date: 7th of Aban (28, 29, 30, or 31 October)
- Frequency: Annual
- Locations: Pasargadae, Fars province (AKA Persis)
- Coordinates: 30°11′38″N 53°10′02″E
- Country: Iran
- Years active: 1977–present
- Major events: Publicly commemorating the legacy of Cyrus the Great and his Achaemenid Empire
- Notable events: 2,500th Anniversary of the Persian Empire (1971); Cyrus the Great Day Revolt (2016)

Cyrus the Great Day (Persian: روز کوروش بزرگ Rūz-e Kuroš-e Bozorg) is an unofficial holiday in Iran. Secular and nationalist in nature, it commemorates the legacy of Cyrus II of Persia, who founded the Achaemenid Empire in the 6th century BCE. It is observed annually on the 7th of Aban on the Iranian Solar Hijri calendar, thus corresponding to a date between 28 and 31 October on the international Gregorian calendar.

Celebrations typically consist of public gatherings at Pasargadae, where the tomb of Cyrus the Great is located. Though Cyrus the Great Day itself has not had official recognition, similar gatherings at Pasargadae were informally endorsed by the Pahlavi dynasty, and Iran's last king Mohammad Reza Pahlavi also had Cyrus' tomb renovated for the 2,500-year celebration of the Persian Empire in October 1971. Since the Islamic Revolution in 1979, the Islamic Republic government has occasionally cracked down on celebratory gatherings at Pasargadae; the 2016 Cyrus the Great Revolt saw the eruption of a major anti-government protest near Cyrus' tomb, ultimately leading to the broader 2017–2018 Iranian protests. In October 2021, Iranian police officers barred people from visiting Cyrus' tomb for the holiday.

== History ==
Based on some historical records, 29 October was the day when Cyrus entered Babylon after the Neo-Babylonian Empire fell to the Achaemenid Persians in the Battle of Opis. The holiday is observed by Iranian nationalists and monarchists to pay homage to Iran's pre-Islamic history.

The celebrations are unofficial, and the holiday is not designated on any official calendar, neither on the Iranian calendars nor on those of the UNESCO. There have been calls for the Iranian government to recognize the day at the official level. In 2017, Bahram Parsaei, the representative of the electoral district of Shiraz in the Iranian parliament, openly voiced the demand for the state to recognize and observe the holiday.

== 2016 Cyrus the Great Revolt ==
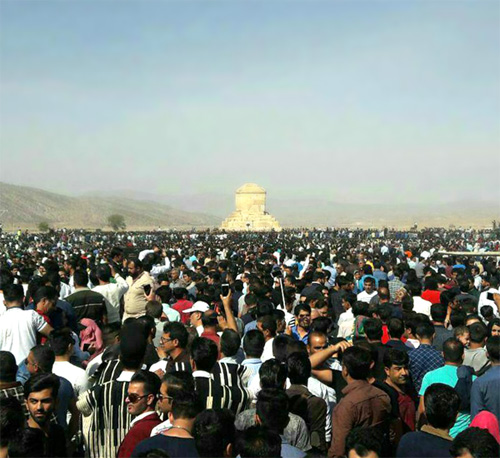
Gatherings at Pasargadae on 28 October 2016

In 2016, the holiday occurred on 28 October (due to the overlapping of leap years in the Iranian and Gregorian calendars) and fell on Friday (official weekend day in Iran due to its Islamic significance). Consequently, the tomb of Cyrus at Pasargadae attracted thousands of people from across the country who celebrated the day and chanted nationalist slogans. Nomads, tribesmen and ethnic minorities, including Kurds and Iranian Arabs, were present at the celebrations in their traditional ethnic clothing. The attendance was unprecedented according to spectators, and the roads leading to the tomb reportedly saw a large traffic jam.

An unofficial 2017 estimate puts the attendance figure at between 15,000 and 20,000 people.

=== Protests ===
The gatherings eventually morphed into protests against the ruling Islamic theocracy. Iranian protestors reportedly chanted "No Gaza, no Palestine, we will only sacrifice ourselves for Iran!", "Iran is our homeland; Cyrus is our father," and "Clerical rule is synonymous with only tyranny, only war", as well as "Freedom of thought cannot take place with beards" were among the slogans in the amateur videos going viral on social media.

According to Reuters, protesters shouted anti-Arab and pro-Shah slogans. A judiciary official said that the organizers of the event were arrested.

== 2017 Islamic Republic crackdown ==
In October 2017, an official statement by local authorities from the Ministry of Cultural Heritage, Handicrafts and Tourism in Fars province was published and circulated on social media, declaring that Cyrus' tomb would be closed to the Iranian public between 27 and 30 October 2017. However, the director of the ministry officially denied that any plans for a shutdown of the tomb were being made in the days leading up to the holiday.

Subsequently, all roads leading to Pasargad County were closed by Iranian authorities, who cited "ongoing construction" as the reason for the shutdown. Fences were erected around the mausoleum in Pasargadae and paramilitary Basij troops were stationed in the region to hold a drill. The mouthpiece of the Iranian judiciary stated that the Ministry of Intelligence had disrupted plans for the "illegal gathering" on Cyrus the Great Day.
