= Haloo =

Iranian writer

Halloo
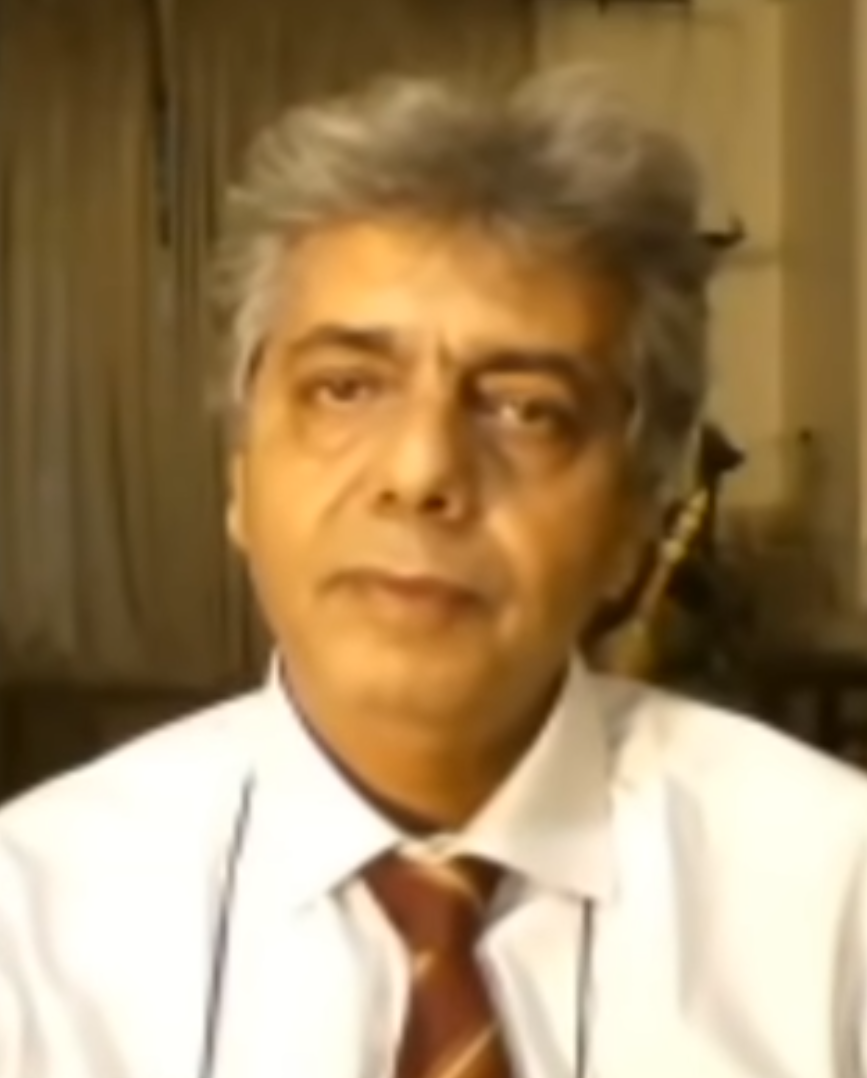
- Born: MohammadReza Alee Payam; June 10, 1957 (age 68); Tehran, Iran
- Occupation: Poet
- Website: haalou.com

MohammadReza Alee Payam (Persian: محمدرضا عالی‌پیام, born June 10, 1957), also known by his pen name as Halloo (Persian: هالو), is an Iranian poet and satirist. He has published ten volumes of books of satire poems and more than 10,000 of his books have been sold in Iran.

== Film & TV ==
Halloo is a film maker and is a member of Iranian Screenwriters Association. One of his movies is called "Ghazian Afghan" which was aired in Iranian national television. During the production of this movie, he spent two years in Afghanistan (1980-1982) and lived seven months in Panjshir Valley with "Ahmad Shah Masoud".

MohammadReza Alee Payam also served as producer in: "Bicycleran (Cyclist)" directed by Mohsen Makhmalbaf, "Parvaz Az Ordugah", "Delam Baraye Pesaram Tang Shode", "Raze Khanjar", "Khaste Nabashid", and "Mushu".

He has also served as an actor in "Sarbedaran" TV-series and "Jonge Athar" and "Tavahom" movies. He personally directed 2 movies which are called "Khaste Nabashid" and "Mushu".

Alee Payam also has many experience in the field of screenwriting in the movies: "Parvaz Az Ordugah", "Mushu", and "Khaste Nabashid". In the movies "Tavahom" and "Sarbedaran" he had the experience of set designing as well.

In the working career of MohammadReza Alee Payam he also produced 80 short films and documentaries. He is a member of screenwriters of Iran association and Iran's producers association. MohammadReza Alee Payam is also a poet and a member of "Amirkabir" and "Parvin Etesami" literature association. He published 10 books of his poems.

== Imprisonment ==
He was arrested and taken to Evin Prison on 14 Aug 2012. Then on 09 Sep 2012 he was released on bail for approximately $50,000. He was again imprisoned on April 23, 2015 for the same reason as 2012.

== Poems ==
- Drought (خشکسالى)
- Conversations with Hafez (گفت‌وگو با حافظ)
- Asking for forgiveness
- Die and Hehrie
- Fuel price (قیمت بنزین)

== See also ==
- Persian satire
