= Taş Kule =

Taş Kule Persian Tomb Monument
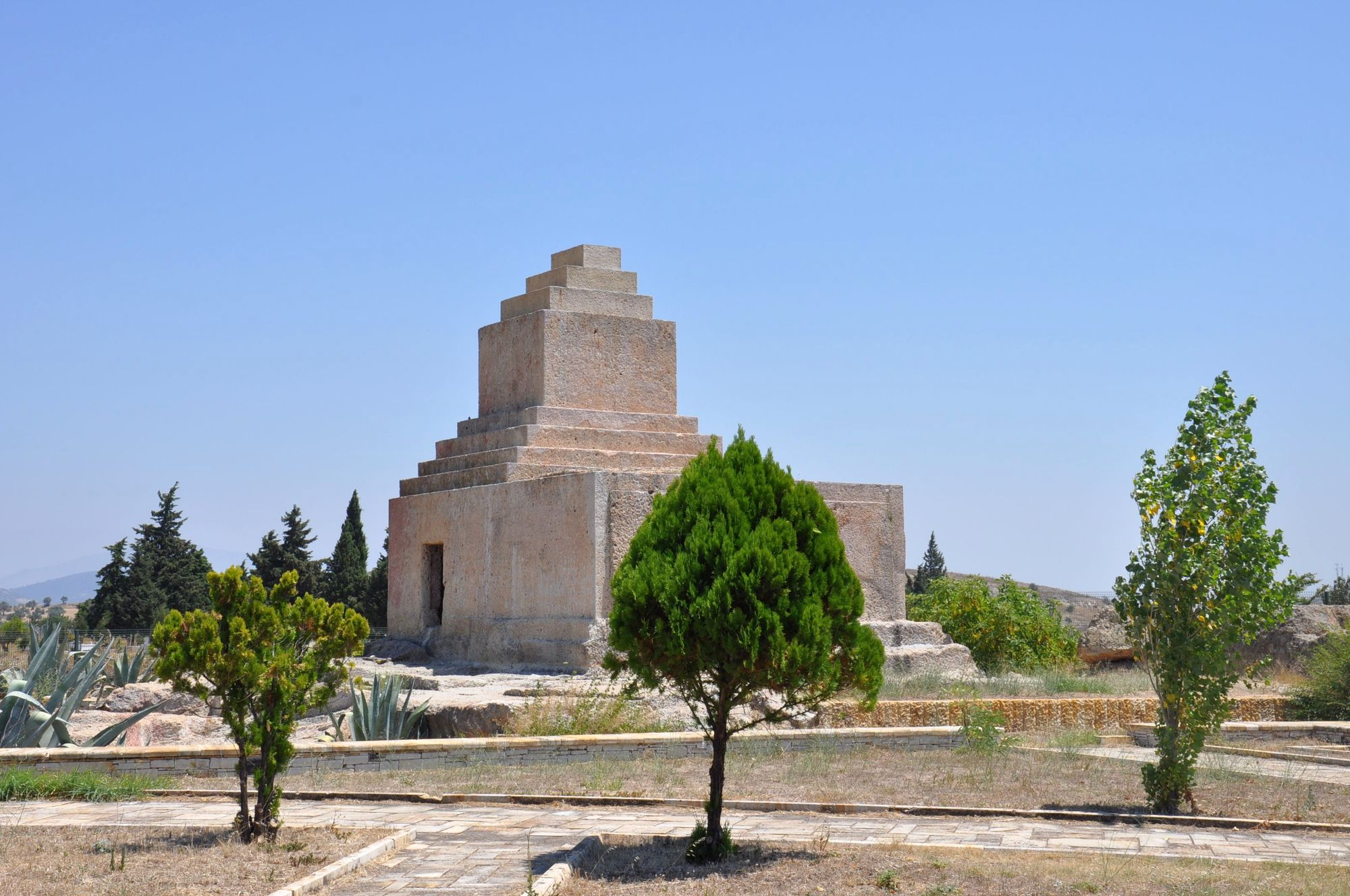
- Taş Kule

- Location within Turkey
- 38°39′37.6″N 26°49′21.3″E
- Type: Mausoleum
- Location: İzmir Province, Turkey
- Region: Anatolia

Site notes
- Condition: In ruins

Taş Kule or Persian Tomb Monument is a 4th century BC Persian influenced tomb near Phocaea, now Foça in modern day Turkey.

Little surviving structures from ancient Phocaea remain today. The structure is 4.5 metres high, consisting of a two-storey structure with the sarcophagus on the top.

The tomb was constructed during the Achaemenid Persian period and dates from between 546 and 480 BCE. It is carved from a limestone rock formation. It lies 7 km east of Eski Foça and the modern and probably also ancient road to the settlement runs within 100 metres of the tomb.

Nicholas Cahill says that the tomb "does not fit easily into established architectural traditions of Asia Minor; no exact parallels are known for its shape and decoration. Hence there is no general agreement about its date or the architectural tradition to which it belongs", though it has been compared to earlier Phrygian monuments.
