= Richard Sale =

Richard Sale may refer to:

- Dick Sale (1919–1987), English cricketer and schoolmaster
- Richard Sale (cricketer) (1889–1970), English cricketer and schoolmaster
- Richard Sale (director) (1911–1993), American screenwriter and film director
- Richard Sale (journalist) (born 1939), American journalist and novelist
