= United States involvement in regime change =

List of U.S.-backed regime change operations

Since the 19th century, the United States government has participated and interfered, both overtly and covertly, in the replacement of many foreign governments. In the latter half of the 19th century, the U.S. government initiated actions for regime change mainly in Latin America and the southwest Pacific, including the Spanish–American and Philippine–American wars. At the onset of the 20th century, the United States shaped or installed governments in many countries around the world, including neighbors Hawaii, Panama, Honduras, Nicaragua, Mexico, Haiti, and the Dominican Republic.

During World War II, the U.S. helped overthrow many Nazi German or Imperial Japanese-controlled puppet regimes. Examples include regimes in the Philippines, Korea, East China, and parts of Europe. United States forces, together with the United Kingdom and Soviet Union, were also instrumental in collapsing Adolf Hitler's government in Germany and deposing Benito Mussolini in Italy. At the end of World War II, the U.S. government struggled with the Soviet Union for global leadership, influence and security within the context of the Cold War. Under the Truman administration, the U.S. government, ostensibly for fear that Soviet Communism would be spread, sometimes with the assistance of the Soviet's own involvement in regime change, promoted the domino theory, a precedent which later presidents followed. Subsequently, the U.S. expanded the geographic scope of its actions beyond the traditional area of operations; Central America and the Caribbean.

Significant operations included the United States and United Kingdom–planned 1953 Iranian coup d'état, the 1954 Guatemalan coup d'état, the 1961 Bay of Pigs Invasion targeting Cuba, and support for the overthrow of Sukarno by General Suharto in Indonesia. In addition, the U.S. has interfered in the national elections of countries, including Italy in 1948, the Philippines in 1953, Japan in the 1950s and 1960s, Lebanon in 1957, and Russia in 1996. According to one study, the U.S. performed at least 81 overt and covert known interventions in foreign elections from 1946 to 2000. According to another study, the U.S. engaged in 64 covert and six overt attempts at regime change during the Cold War. Following the dissolution of the Soviet Union, the United States has led or supported wars to determine the governance of a number of countries. Stated U.S. aims in these conflicts have included fighting the war on terror, as in the Afghan War, or removing supposed weapons of mass destruction (WMDs), as in the Iraq War. In the 2020s, the second Donald Trump administration was heavily involved in regime change efforts using economic pressure and military threats like in the Greenland crisis and 2026 Cuban crisis and removed or killed government officials using military force in the 2026 United States intervention in Venezuela and the 2026 Iran war.

== Prior to 1887 ==
=== 1846–1848: Annexation of Texas and invasion of California ===
The United States annexed the Republic of Texas, at the time considered by Mexico to be a rebellious state of Mexico. During the war with Mexico that ensued, the United States seized Alta California from Mexico.

=== 1865–1867: Mexico ===
While the American Civil War was taking place in the United States, France and other countries invaded Mexico to collect debts. France then installed Habsburg prince Maximilian I as the Emperor of Mexico. After the Civil War ended, the United States began supporting the Liberal forces of Benito Juárez (who had been the interim President of Mexico since 1858 under the liberal Constitution of 1857 and then elected as president in 1861 before the French invasion) against the forces of Maximilian. The United States began sending and dropping arms into Mexico and many Americans fought alongside Juárez. Eventually, Juárez and the Liberals took back power and executed Maximillian I.

The United States had opposed Maximilian, invoking the Monroe Doctrine. Around 1867, shortly afterwards, Secretary of State William Seward exposited: "The Monroe Doctrine, which eight years ago was merely a theory, is now an irreversible fact."

== 1887–1912: U.S. expansionism and Roosevelt administration ==
=== 1880s ===
==== 1887–1889: Samoa ====
Samoa in Oceania

In the 1880s, Samoa was a monarchy with two rival claimants to the throne: Malietoa Laupepa and Mata'afa Iosefo. The Samoan crisis was a confrontation between the United States, Germany and the United Kingdom from 1887 to 1889, with the powers backing rival claimants to the throne of the Samoan Islands which became the First Samoan Civil War.

=== 1890s ===
==== 1893: Kingdom of Hawaii ====
Hawaii in Oceania

Anti-monarchists, mostly Americans, in Hawaii, engineered the overthrow of the Kingdom of Hawaii. On January 17, 1893, the native monarch, Queen Lili'uokalani, was overthrown. Hawaii was initially reconstituted as an independent republic, but the ultimate goal of the action was the annexation of the islands to the United States, which was finally accomplished with the Newlands Resolution of 1898.

==== 1899–1902: Philippines ====
The successful Philippine Revolution saw the defeat of the Spanish Empire and the establishment of the First Philippine Republic, ending centuries of Spanish colonial rule in the archipelago. The U.S., which had allied with the revolutionaries and emerged victorious in the concurrent Spanish–American War, was "granted" the Philippines in the Treaty of Paris. Wishing to establish its own control over the country, the U.S. engaged in the Philippine–American War, the success of which saw the dissolution of the self-governing Philippine Republic and formation of an Insular Government of the Philippine Islands in 1902. The Philippines became a self-governing Commonwealth in 1935 and was granted full sovereignty by 1946.

=== 1900s ===
==== 1903: Colombia ====
In September 1903 Manuel Amador Guerrero, leader of the movement for Panamanian independence from Colombia, traveled to New York to determine how the United States might support the movement. U.S. President Theodore Roosevelt privately supported the separatist movement, later ordering the warship USS Nashville under commander John Hubbard to proceed first to Jamaica, then to Panama.

==== 1903–1925: Honduras ====

In what became known as the "Banana Wars", between the end of the Spanish–American War in 1898 and the inception of the Good Neighbor Policy in 1934, the U.S. staged many military invasions and interventions in Central America and the Caribbean. One of these incursions, in 1903, involved regime change rather than regime preservation. The United States Marine Corps, which most often fought these wars, developed a manual called The Strategy and Tactics of Small Wars in 1921 based on its experiences. On occasion, the Navy provided gunfire support and Army troops were also used. The United Fruit Company and Standard Fruit Company dominated Honduras' key banana export sector and associated land holdings and railways. The U.S. staged invasions and incursions of US troops in 1903 (supporting a coup by Manuel Bonilla), 1907 (supporting Bonilla against a Nicaraguan-backed coup), 1911 and 1912 (defending the regime of Miguel R. Davila from an uprising), 1919 (peacekeeping during a civil war, and installing the caretaker government of Francisco Bográn), 1920 (defending the Bográn regime from a general strike), 1924 (defending the regime of Rafael López Gutiérrez from an uprising) and 1925 (defending the elected government of Miguel Paz Barahona) to defend US interests.

==== 1906–1909: Cuba ====

After the explosion of the USS Maine the United States declared war on Spain, starting the Spanish–American War. The United States invaded and occupied Spanish-ruled Cuba in 1898. Many in the United States did not want to annex Cuba and Congress passed the Teller Amendment, forbidding annexation. Cuba was occupied by the U.S. and run by military governor Leonard Wood during the first occupation from 1898 to 1902, after the end of the war. The Platt Amendment was passed later on outlining Cuba–United States relations. It said the U.S. could intervene anytime against a government that was not approved, forced Cuba to accept U.S. influence, and limited Cuban abilities to make foreign relations. The United States forced Cuba to accept the terms of the Platt Amendment, by putting it into their constitution. After the occupation, Cuba and the U.S. would sign the Cuban–American Treaty of Relations in 1903, further agreeing to the terms of the Platt Amendment.

Tomás Estrada Palma became the first President of Cuba after the U.S. withdrew. He was a member of the Republican Party of Havana. He was re-elected in 1905 unopposed; however, the Liberals accused him of electoral fraud. Fighting began between the Liberals and Republicans. Due to the tensions he resigned on September 28, 1906, and his government collapsed soon afterwards. U.S. Secretary of war William Howard Taft invoked the Platt Amendment and the 1903 treaty, under approval of President Theodore Roosevelt, invading the country, and occupying it. The country would be governed by Charles Edward Magoon during the occupation. They oversaw the election of José Miguel Gómez in 1909, and afterwards withdrew from the country.

==== 1909–1910: Nicaragua ====
Governor Juan José Estrada, member of the Conservative Party, led a revolt against President José Santos Zelaya, member of the Liberal Party reelected in 1906. This became what is known as the Estrada rebellion. The United States supported the conservative forces because Zelaya had wanted to work with Germany or Japan to build a new canal through the country. The U.S. controlled the Panama Canal and did not want competition from another country outside of the Americas. Thomas P Moffat, a US council in Bluefields, Nicaragua, would give overt support, in conflict with the US trying to only give covert support. Direct intervention would be pushed by the secretary of state Philander C. Knox. Two Americans were executed by Zelaya for their participation with the conservatives. Seeing an opportunity the United States became directly involved in the rebellion and sent in troops, which landed on the Mosquito Coast. On December 14, 1909, Zelaya was forced to resign under diplomatic pressure from America and fled Nicaragua. Before Zelaya fled, he, along with the liberal assembly, chose José Madriz to lead Nicaragua. The U.S. refused to recognize Madriz. The conservatives eventually beat back the liberals and forced Madriz to resign. Estrada then became the president. Thomas Cleland Dawson was sent as a special agent to the country and determined that any election held would bring the liberals into power, so had Estrada set up a constituent assembly to elect him instead. In August 1910 Estrada became President of Nicaragua under U.S. recognition, agreeing to certain conditions from the U.S. After the intervention, the U.S. and Nicaragua signed a treaty on June 6, 1911.

== 1912–1941: Wilson administration, World War I and interwar period ==
=== 1910s ===
==== 1912–1933: Nicaragua ====

The Taft administration sent troops into Nicaragua and occupied the country. When the Wilson administration came into power, they extended the stay and took complete financial and governmental control of the country, leaving a heavily armed legation. U.S. president Calvin Coolidge removed troops from the country, leaving a legation and Adolfo Diaz in charge of the country. Rebels ended up capturing the town with the legation and Diaz requested troops came back, which they did a few months after leaving. The U.S. government fought against rebels led by Augusto Cesar Sandino. Franklin D. Roosevelt pulled out because the U.S. could no longer afford to keep troops in the country due to the Great Depression. The second intervention in Nicaragua would become one of the longest wars in United States history. The United States left the Somoza family in charge, who killed Sandino in 1934.

==== 1913: Mexico ====
Henry Lane Wilson, U.S. ambassador to Mexico under William Howard Taft, actively supported the Ten Tragic Days coup which overthrew the democratically elected president, Francisco I. Madero. Soon after taking office, U.S. president Woodrow Wilson dismissed the ambassador and refused to recognize the Mexican government of Victoriano Huerta, who had seized power in the coup. This led to the United States occupation of Veracruz in 1914 and continued instability in Mexico.

==== 1915–1934: Haiti ====

The U.S. occupied Haiti from 1915 to 1934. U.S.-based banks had lent money to Haiti and the banks requested U.S. government intervention. In an example of "gunboat diplomacy", the U.S. sent its navy to intimidate to get its way. Eventually, in 1917, the U.S. installed a new government and dictated the terms of a new Haitian constitution of 1917 that instituted changes that included an end to the prior ban on land ownership by non-Haitians. The Cacos were originally armed militias of formerly enslaved persons who rebelled and took control of mountainous areas following the Haitian Revolution in 1804. Such groups fought a guerrilla war against the U.S. occupation in what were known as the "Caco Wars".

==== 1916–1924: Dominican Republic ====

U.S. marines invaded the Dominican Republic and occupied it from 1916 to 1924, and this was preceded by US military interventions in 1903, 1904, and 1914. The US Navy installed its personnel in all key positions in government and controlled the Dominican military and police. Within a couple of days, President Juan Isidro Jimenes resigned.

==== 1918–1920: Russia ====

In 1918, the U.S. military took part in the Allied intervention in the Russian Civil War to support the White movement and overthrow the Bolsheviks. President Wilson agreed to send 5,000 United States Army troops in the campaign. This force, which became known as the "American North Russia Expeditionary Force" (a.k.a. the Polar Bear Expedition) launched the North Russia Campaign from Arkhangelsk, while another 8,000 soldiers, organised as the American Expeditionary Force Siberia, launched the Siberia intervention from Vladivostok. The forces were withdrawn in 1920.

== 1941–1945: World War II and aftermath ==
=== 1941–1952: Japan ===
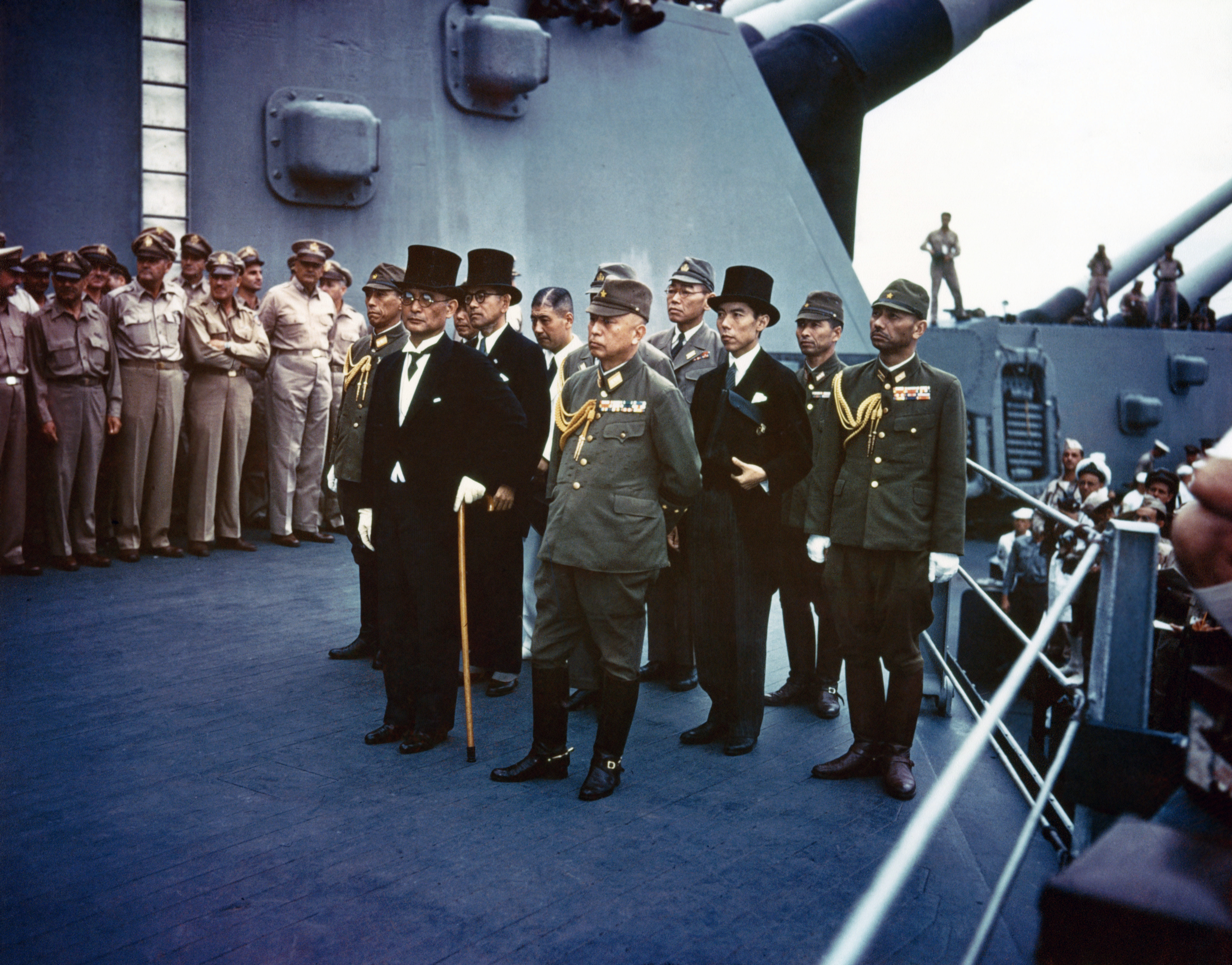
Representatives of the Empire of Japan stand aboard USS Missouri prior to signing of the Instrument of Surrender

In December 1941, the US joined the Allies in war against the Empire of Japan, a monarchy. After the Allied victory, Japan was occupied by Allied forces under the command of American general Douglas MacArthur. In 1946, the Japanese Diet ratified a new Constitution of Japan that followed closely a 'model copy' prepared by MacArthur's command, and was promulgated as an amendment to the old Prussian-style Meiji Constitution. The constitution renounced aggressive war and was accompanied by liberalization of many areas of Japanese life. While liberalizing life for most Japanese, the Allies tried many Japanese war criminals and executed some, while granting amnesty to the family of emperor Hirohito. The occupation was ended by the Treaty of San Francisco.

Following the United States invasion of Okinawa during the Pacific War, the U.S. installed the United States Military Government of the Ryukyu Islands. Pursuant to a treaty with the Japanese government (Message of Emperor), in 1950 the United States Civil Administration of the Ryukyu Islands took over and ruled Okinawa and the rest of the Ryukyu Islands until 1972. During this "trusteeship rule", the U.S. built numerous military bases, including bases that operated nuclear weapons. U.S. rule was opposed by many local residents, creating the Ryukyu independence movement that struggled against U.S. rule.

=== 1941–1949: Germany ===
In December 1941, the United States joined the Allied campaign against Nazi Germany, a fascist dictatorship. The US took part in the Allied occupation and Denazification of the Western portion of Germany. Former Nazis were subjected to varying levels of punishment, depending on how the US assessed their levels of guilt. At the end of 1947, for example, the Allies held 90,000 Nazis in detention; another 1,900,000 were forbidden to work as anything but manual laborers. As Germans took more and more responsibility for Germany, they pushed for an end to the denazification process, and the Americans allowed this. In 1949, the Federal Republic of Germany, a parliamentary democracy in West Germany was formed. The main denazification process came to an end with amnesty laws passed in 1951.

=== 1941–1946: Italy ===
In July–August 1943, the US participated in the Allied invasion of Sicily, spearheaded by the U.S. Seventh Army, under Lieutenant General George S. Patton, in which over 2,000 US servicemen were killed, initiating the Italian Campaign which conquered Italy from the fascist regime of Benito Mussolini and its Nazi German allies. Mussolini was arrested by order of King Victor Emmanuel III, provoking a civil war. The king appointed Pietro Badoglio as new Prime Minister. Badoglio stripped away the final elements of Fascist rule by banning the National Fascist Party, then signed an armistice with the Allied armed forces. The Royal Italian Army outside of the peninsula itself collapsed; its occupied and annexed territories fell under German control. Italy capitulated to the Allies on 3 September 1943. The northern half of the country was occupied by the Germans with help from Italian fascists and made a collaborationist puppet state, while the south was governed by monarchist forces, which fought for the Allied cause as the Italian Co-Belligerent Army.

=== 1944–1946: France ===
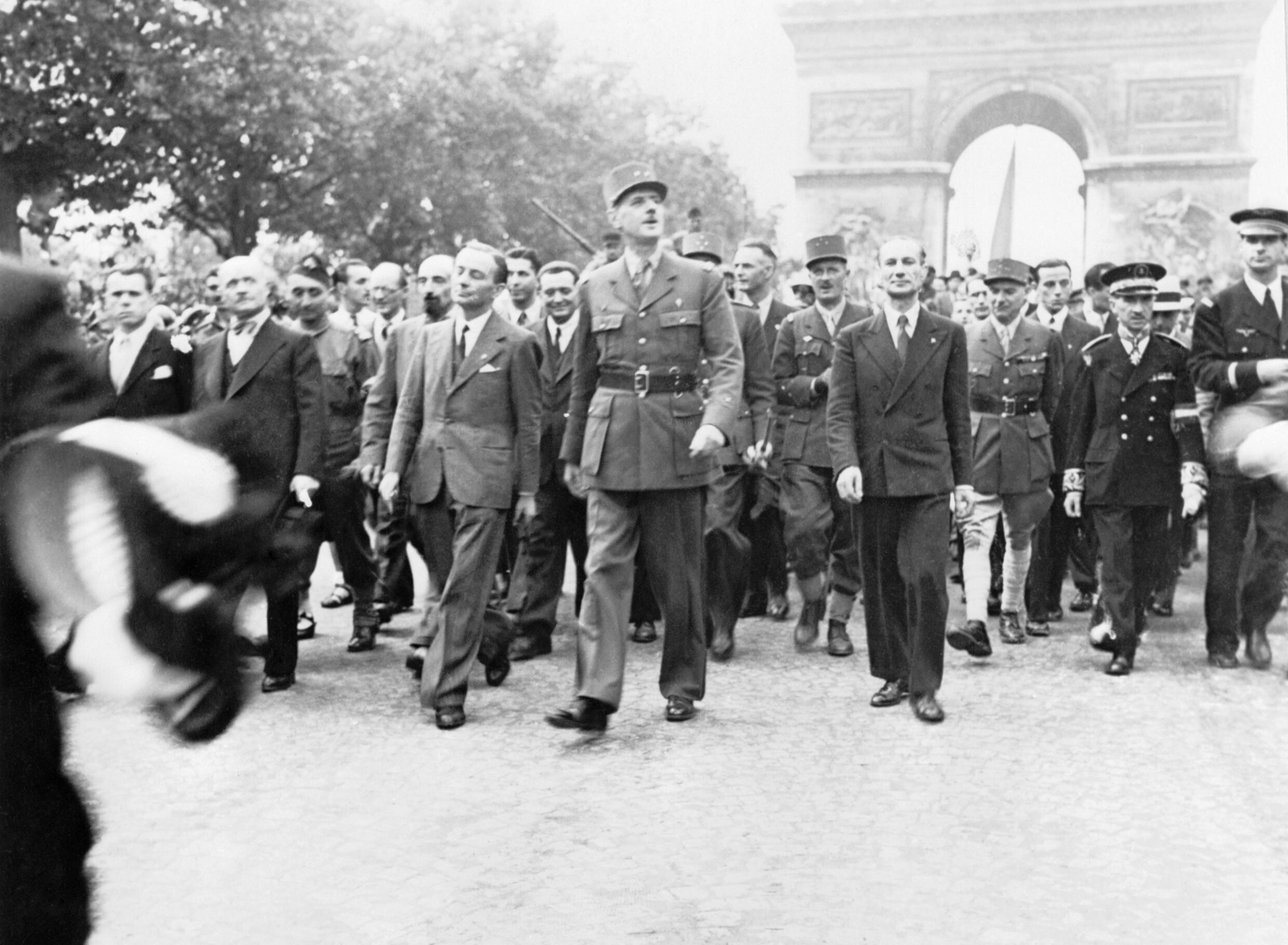
General Charles de Gaulle and his entourage proudly stroll down the Champs-Élysées to Notre-Dame Cathedral for a Te Deum ceremony following Paris's liberation on 25 August 1944.

British, Canadian, and United States forces were critical participants in Operation Goodwood and Operation Cobra, leading to a military breakout that ended the Nazi occupation of France. The actual Liberation of Paris was accomplished by French forces. The French formed the Provisional Government of the French Republic in 1944, leading to the formation of the French Fourth Republic in 1946. The liberation of France is celebrated regularly up to the present day.

=== 1944–1945: Belgium ===
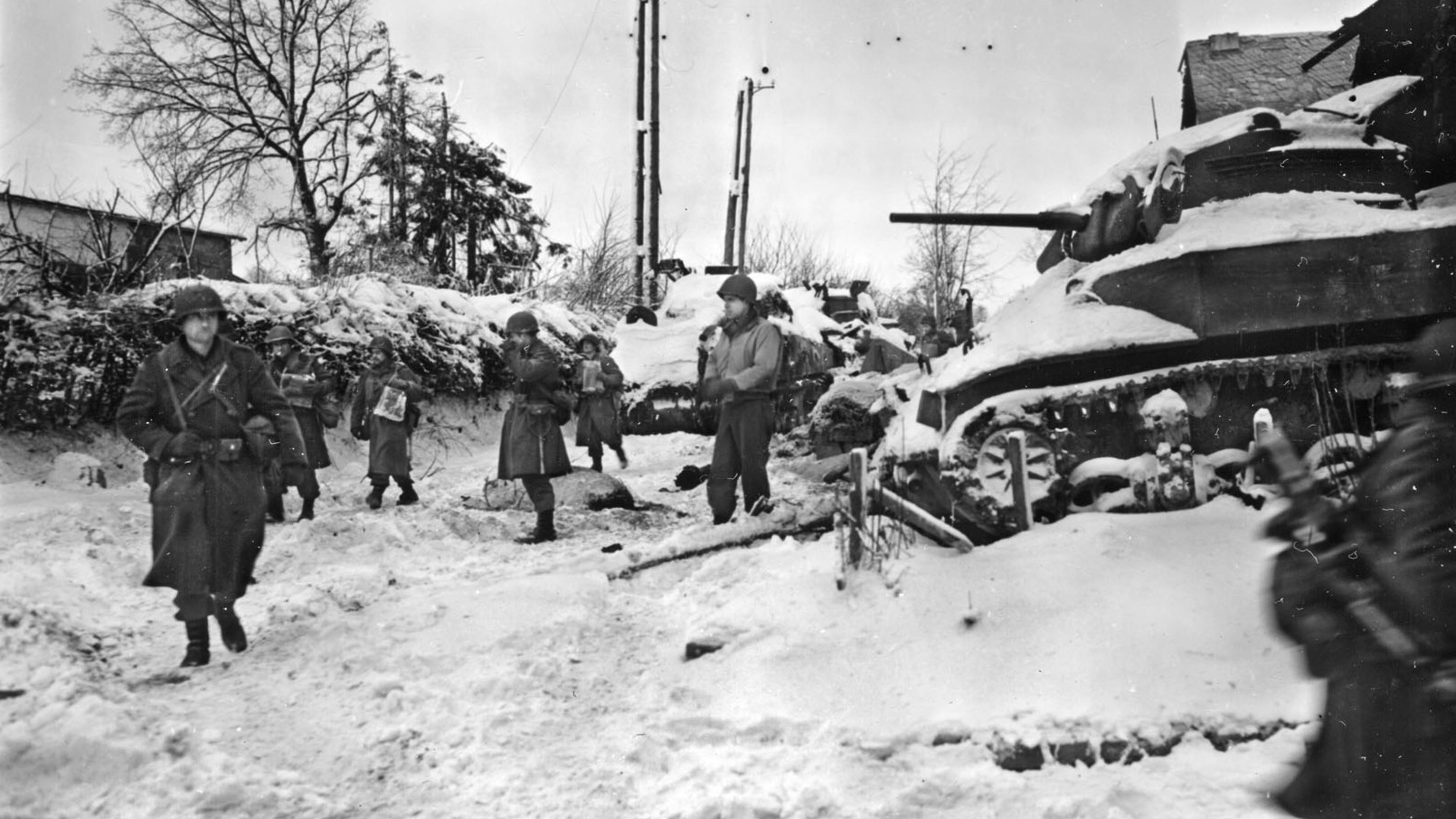
American troops during the Battle of the Bulge

In the wake of the 1940 invasion, Germany established the Reichskommissariat of Belgium and Northern France to govern Belgium. United States, Canadian, British, and other Allied forces ended the Nazi occupation of most of Belgium in September 1944. The Belgian Government in Exile under Prime Minister Hubert Pierlot returned on 8 September. In December, American forces suffered over 80,000 casualties defending Belgium from a German counterattack in the Battle of the Bulge. By February 1945, all of Belgium was in Allied hands. The year 1945 was chaotic. Pierlot resigned, and Achille Van Acker of the Belgian Socialist Party formed a new government. There were riots over the Royal Question—the return of King Leopold III. Although the war continued, Belgians were again in control of their own country.

=== 1944–1945: Netherlands ===
During the Nazi occupation, the Netherlands was governed by the Reichskommissariat Niederlande, headed by Arthur Seyss-Inquart. British, Canadian, and American forces liberated portions of the Netherlands in September 1944; however, after the failure of Operation Market Garden, the liberation of the largest cities had to wait until the last weeks of the European theatre of World War II. British and American forces crossed the Rhine on 23 March 1945; Canadian forces in their wake then entered the Netherlands from the east. The remaining German forces in the Netherlands surrendered on 5 May, which is celebrated as Liberation Day in the Netherlands. Queen Wilhelmina returned on 2 May; elections were held in 1946, leading to a new government headed by Prime Minister Louis Beel.

=== 1944–1945: Philippines ===
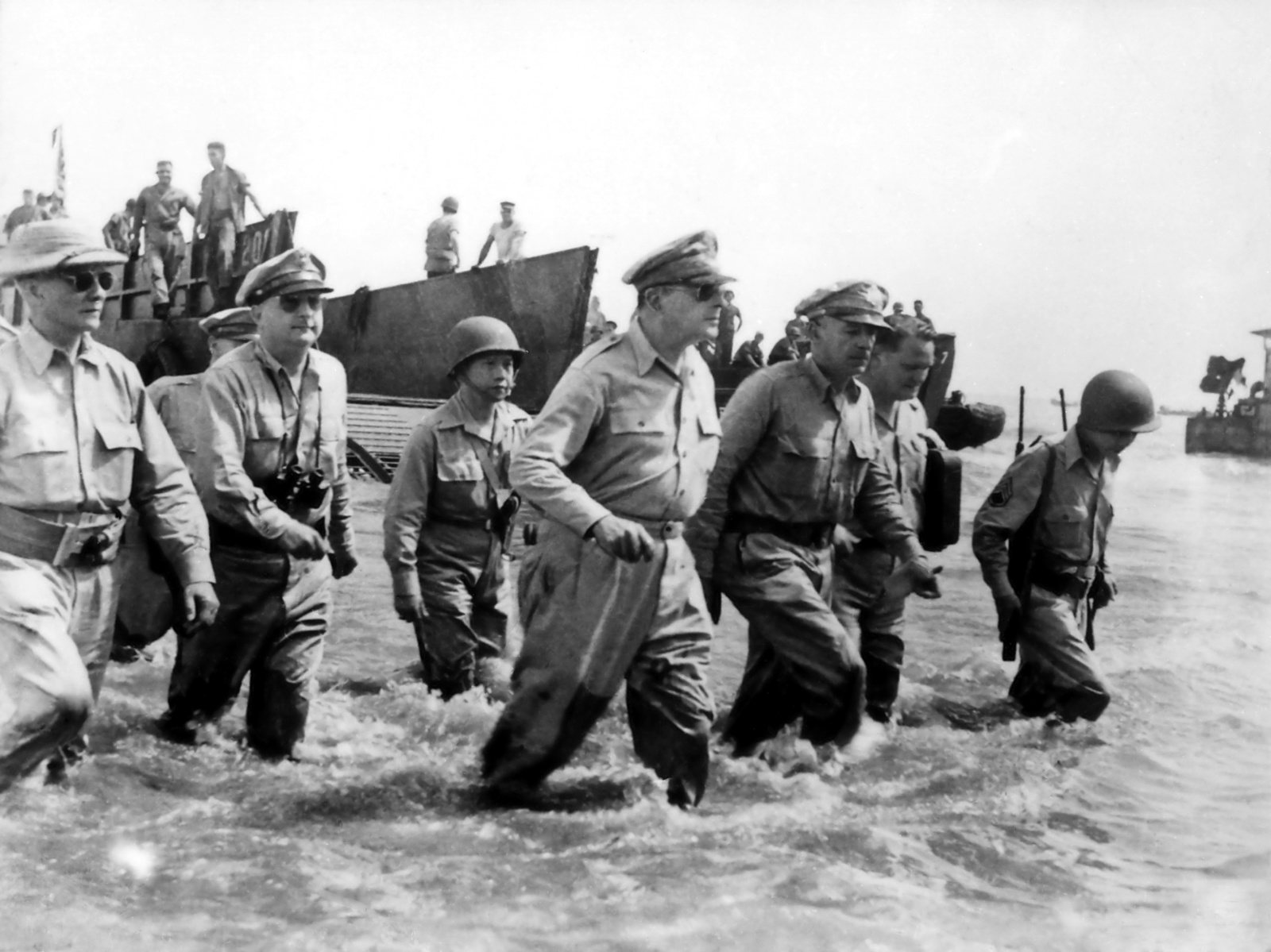
General Douglas MacArthur, President Osmeña and staff land at Palo, Leyte on October 20, 1944

United States landings in 1944 ended the Japanese occupation of the Philippines. After the Japanese were defeated and the puppet regime that was controlling the Second Philippine Republic was overthrown, the United States fulfilled a promise by granting independence to the Philippines. Sergio Osmeña formed the government of the restored Commonwealth of the Philippines, overseeing democratic transition to the fully sovereign Third Philippine Republic in 1946.

=== 1945–1955: Austria ===
Austria was annexed to Germany in the 1938 Anschluss. As German citizens, many Austrians fought on the side of Germany during World War II. After the Allied victory, the Allies treated Austria as a victim of Nazi aggression, rather than as a perpetrator. The United States Marshall Plan provided aid. The 1955 Austrian State Treaty re-established Austria as a free, democratic, and sovereign state. It was signed by representatives of the United States, the Soviet Union, the United Kingdom, and France. It provided for the withdrawal of all occupying troops and guaranteed Austrian neutrality in the Cold War.

== 1945–1991: Cold War ==
=== 1940s ===
==== 1945–1948: South Korea ====
The Empire of Japan surrendered to the United States in August 1945, ending the Japanese rule of Korea. Under the leadership of Lyuh Woon-Hyung People's Committees throughout Korea formed to coordinate transition to Korean independence. On August 28, 1945, these committees formed the temporary national government of Korea, naming it the People's Republic of Korea (PRK) a couple of weeks later. On September 8, 1945, the United States government landed forces in Korea and thereafter established the United States Army Military Government in Korea (USAMGK) to govern Korea south of the 38th parallel. The USAMGK outlawed the PRK committees which by that point had been co-opted by the communists.

In May 1948, Syngman Rhee, who had previously lived in the United States, won the 1948 South Korean presidential election, which had been boycotted by most other politicians and in which voting was limited to property owners and tax payers or, in smaller towns, to town elders voting for everyone else. Syngman Rhee, backed by the U.S. government, set up authoritarian rule that coordinated closely with the business sector and lasted until Rhee's overthrow in 1961, which led to a similarly authoritarian regime that would last ultimately until the late 1980s.

==== 1947–1949: Greece ====

Greece had been under Axis occupation since 1941. Its government-in-exile, unelected and loyal to King George II, was based in Cairo. By the Summer of 1944, Communist guerrillas, then known as the Greek People's Liberation Army (ELAS), who had been armed by the Western powers, exploiting the gradual collapse of the Axis, claimed to have liberated nearly all of Greece outside of Athens from Axis occupation, while also attacking and defeating rival non-Communist partisan groups, forming a rival unelected government, the Political Committee of National Liberation. On 12 August 1944, German forces retreated from the Athens area two days ahead of British landings there, ending the occupation.

The British Armed Forces together with Greek forces under control of the Greek government (now a government of national unity led by Konstantinos Tsaldaris, elected in the 1946 Greek legislative election boycotted by the Communist Party of Greece) then fought for control of the country in the Greek Civil War against the Communists, who at that time were self-proclaimed as the Democratic Army of Greece (DSE). By early 1947, the British government could no longer afford the huge cost of financing the war against DSE, and pursuant to the October 1944 Percentages Agreement between Winston Churchill and Joseph Stalin, Greece was to remain part of the Western sphere of influence. Accordingly, the British requested the U.S. government to step in and the U.S. flooded the country with military equipment, military advisers and weapons. With increased U.S. military aid, by September 1949 the government eventually won, fully restoring the Kingdom of Greece.

==== 1948: Costa Rica ====
Christian socialist medic Rafael Ángel Calderón Guardia of the National Republican Party was elected in 1944 and promoted general social reforms. In the 1948 election, the opposition won the presidency but lost the Congress. This prompted the Congress to annul the results of the presidential election but not the results of the congressional election; on the same day as the annulment, the leader of the opposition campaign was assassinated. These events led to the short-lived Costa Rican Civil War of 1948, in which the US supported the opposition, and Somoza-run Nicaragua supported Calderón. The war ended Calderón's government and led to the short de facto rule of 18 months by José Figueres Ferrer. However, Figueres also held some left-leaning ideas and continued the process of social reform. After the war, democracy was quickly restored and a two-party system encompassed by the parties of the Calderonistas and Figueristas developed in the country for nearly 60 years.

==== 1949–1953: Albania ====

Albania was in chaos after World War II and the country was not as focused on peacetime conferences in comparison to other European nations, while having suffered high casualties. It was threatened by its larger neighbors with annexation. After Yugoslavia dropped out of the Eastern Bloc, the small country of Albania was geographically isolated from the rest of the Eastern Bloc. The United States and United Kingdom took advantage of the situation and recruited anti-communist Albanians who had fled after the USSR invaded. The US and UK formed the Free Albania National Committee, made up of many of the emigres. Recruited Albanians were trained by the U.S. and U.K. and infiltrated the country multiple times. Eventually, the operation was found out and many of the agents fled, were executed, or were tried. The operation would become a failure. The operation was declassified in 2006, due to the Nazi War Crimes Disclosure Act and is now available in the National Archives.

==== 1949: Syria ====
The government of Shukri al-Quwatli, reelected in 1948, was overthrown by a junta led by the Syrian Army chief of staff at the time, Husni al-Za'im, who became President of Syria on April 11, 1949. Za'im had extensive connections to CIA operatives, and promptly approved the construction of America's TAPLINE oil pipeline in Syria, considered an important Cold War project and blocked by Quwatly's pre-coup government. The actual extent of U.S. involvement in the coup remains unclear.

=== 1950s ===

==== 1950–1953: Burma and China ====
The Chinese Civil War had recently ended, with the Communists winning and the Nationalists losing. The nationalists retreated to areas such as Taiwan and north Burma. Operation Paper began in late 1950, or early 1951, following Chinese involvement in the Korean War. Operation Paper entailed CIA plans used by CIA military advisors on the ground in Burma to assist Kuomintang incursions into Western China over several years, under the command of General Li Mi, with Kuomintang leadership hoping to eventually retake China, despite opposition from the US State Department. However, each attempted invasion was repelled by the Chinese army. The Kuomintang took control of large swaths of Burma, while the government of Burma complained repeatedly of the military invasion to the United Nations. The CIA hired pilots to secretly transport American weapons and supplies from Thailand to the Kuomintang in Burma, and opium from the Kuomintang to Chinese organized drug-traffickers in Bangkok, Thailand, using CAT owned airplanes.

==== 1952: Egypt ====
In February 1952, following January's riots in Cairo amid widespread nationalist discontent over the continued British occupation of the Suez Canal and Egypt's defeat in the 1948 Arab–Israeli War, CIA officer Kermit Roosevelt Jr. was dispatched by the State Department to meet with Farouk I of the Kingdom of Egypt. American policy at that time was to convince Farouk to introduce reforms that would weaken the appeal of Egyptian radicals and stabilize Farouk's grip on power. The U.S. was notified in advance of the successful July coup led by nationalist and anti-Communist Egyptian military officers (the "Free Officers") that replaced the Egyptian monarchy with the Republic of Egypt under the leadership of Mohamed Naguib and Gamal Abdel Nasser. CIA officer Miles Copeland Jr. recounted in his memoirs that Roosevelt helped coordinate the coup during three prior meetings with the plotters (including Nasser, the future Egyptian president); this has not been confirmed by declassified documents but is partially supported by circumstantial evidence. Roosevelt and several of the Egyptians said to have been present in these meetings denied Copeland's account; another U.S. official, William Lakeland, said its veracity is open to question. Hugh Wilford notes that "whether or not the CIA dealt directly with the Free Officers prior to their July 1952 coup, there was extensive secret American-Egyptian contact in the months after the revolution."

==== 1952: Guatemala ====
Operation PBFortune, also known as Operation Fortune, was an aborted covert United States operation to overthrow Guatemalan President Jacobo Árbenz in 1952. The operation was authorized by U.S. President Harry Truman and planned by the Central Intelligence Agency. The plan involved providing weapons to the exiled Guatemalan military officer Carlos Castillo Armas, who was to lead an invasion from Nicaragua.

==== 1952–1953: Iran ====

Since 1941, Iran was a constitutional monarchy ruled by the Shah Mohammad Reza Pahlavi. From the discovery of oil in Iran in the late nineteenth century major powers exploited the weakness of the Iranian government to obtain concessions that many believed failed to give Iran a fair share of the profits. During World War II, the UK, the USSR and the US all became involved in Iranian affairs, including the joint Anglo-Soviet invasion of Iran in 1941. Iranian officials began to notice that British taxes were increasing while royalties to Iran declined. By 1948, Britain received substantially more revenue from the Anglo-Iranian Oil Company (AIOC) than Iran. Negotiations to meet this and other Iranian concerns exacerbated rather than eased tensions.

On March 15, 1951, the Majlis, the Iranian parliament, passed legislation championed by reformist politician Mohammad Mosaddegh to nationalize the AIOC. Fifteen months later, Mosadegh was elected Prime Minister by the Majlis. International business concerns then boycotted oil from the nationalized Iranian oil industry. This contributed to concerns in Britain and the US that Mosadegh might be Communist. He was reportedly supported by the Communist Tudeh Party.

The CIA began supporting 18 of their favorite candidates in the 1952 Iranian legislative election, which Mosaddegh suspended after urban deputies loyal to him were elected. The new parliament gave Mosaddegh emergency powers which weakened the power of the Shah, and there was a constitutional struggle over the roles of the Shah and prime minister. Britain strongly backed the Shah, while the US officially remained neutral. However, America's position shifted in late 1952 with the election of Dwight D. Eisenhower as U.S. president. The CIA launched Operation Ajax, directed by Kermit Roosevelt Jr., with help from Norman Darbyshire, to remove Mosaddegh by persuading the Shah to replace him, using diplomacy and bribery. The 1953 Iranian coup d'état (known in Iran as the "28 Mordad coup") was instigated by the intelligence agencies of the United Kingdom such as MI6 (under the name "Operation Boot") and the United States (under the name "TPAJAX Project").

The coup saw the transition of Pahlavi from a constitutional monarch to an authoritarian, who relied heavily on United States government support. That support dissipated during the Iranian Revolution of 1979, as his own security forces refused to shoot into non-violent crowds. In August 2013, the CIA admitted its role in the coup "as an act of U.S. foreign policy."

==== 1954: Guatemala ====
In a 1954 CIA operation code named Operation PBSuccess, the U.S. government executed a coup that successfully overthrew the government of democratically elected President Jacobo Árbenz, elected in 1950, and installed Carlos Castillo Armas, the first of a line of U.S.-backed right-wing dictators, in its place. The American government and CIA were motivated by the ideological aim of containment, and by lobbying efforts of the United Fruit Company, which was well connected to the CIA and the Eisenhower administration, and feared Árbenz's agrarian reform and anti-explotation labor policies would impact their profits. In planning the operation, the CIA also became involved in assisting the new regime in the killing of perceived opponents, and lied to the president of the United States when briefing him regarding the number of casualties. The perceived success of the operation made it a model for future CIA operations.

==== 1956–1957: Syria ====
In 1956, Operation Straggle was a failed coup plot against Nasserist civilian politician Sabri al-Asali. The CIA made plans for a coup for late October 1956 to topple the Syrian government. The plan entailed takeover by the Syrian military of key cities and border crossings. The plan was postponed when Israel invaded Egypt in October 1956 and U.S. planners thought their operation would be unsuccessful at a time when the Arab world is fighting "Israeli aggression". The operation was uncovered and American plotters had to flee the country.

In 1957, Operation Wappen was a second coup plan against Syria, planned by the CIA's Kermit Roosevelt Jr. It called for assassination of key senior Syrian officials, staged military incidents on the Syrian border to be blamed on Syria and then to be used as pretext for invasion by Iraqi and Jordanian troops, an intense U.S. propaganda campaign targeting the Syrian population, and "sabotage, national conspiracies and various strong-arm activities" to be blamed on Damascus. This operation failed when Syrian military officers paid off with millions of dollars in bribes to carry out the coup revealed the plot to Syrian intelligence. The U.S. Department of State denied accusation of a coup attempt and along with US media accused Syria of being a "satellite" of the USSR.

There was also a third plan in 1957, called "The Preferred Plan". Alongside Britain's MI6, the CIA planned to support and arm several uprisings. However, this plan was never carried out.

==== 1957–1959: Indonesia ====

Starting in 1957, Eisenhower ordered the CIA to overthrow Sukarno. The CIA supported the failed Permesta Rebellion by rebel Indonesian military officers in February 1958. CIA pilots, such as Allen Lawrence Pope, piloted planes operated by a CIA front organization, the Civil Air Transport (CAT), which bombed civilian and military targets in Indonesia. The CIA instructed CAT pilots to target commercial shipping in order to frighten foreign merchant ships away from Indonesian waters, thereby weakening the Indonesian economy and thus destabilizing the government of Indonesia. The CIA aerial bombardment resulted in the sinking of several commercial ships and the bombing of a marketplace that killed many civilians. Pope was shot down and captured on 18 May 1958, revealing U.S. involvement, which Eisenhower publicly denied at the time. The rebellion was ultimately defeated by 1961.

==== 1959: Iraq ====
Iraq in its region

Concerned about the influence of the Iraqi Communist Party (ICP) in Brigadier Abd al-Karim Qasim's administration, President Eisenhower questioned that "it might be good policy to help [Gamal Abdel Nasser] take over in Iraq," recommending that Nasser be provided with "money and support", thus the U.S. "moved into increasingly close alignment with Egypt with regard to Qasim and Iraq." After Iraq withdrew from the anti-Soviet alliance—the Baghdad Pact—the United States National Security Council (NSC) proposed various contingencies for preventing a Communist takeover of the country, and "soon developed a detailed plan for assisting nationalist elements committed to the overthrow of Qasim." The U.S. also "approached Nasser to discuss 'parallel measures' that could be taken by the two countries against Iraq."

During a NSC meeting on September 24, two representatives from the State Department urged a cautious approach, while the other twelve representatives, namely from the CIA and the Department of Defense, "strong[ly] pitch[ed] for a more active policy toward Iraq." One CIA representative noted that there is a "small stockpile [of weapons] in the area," and that the CIA "could support elements in Jordan and the UAR to help Iraqis filter back to Iraq." That same day, the NSC would also prepare a study which called for "covert assistance to Egyptian efforts to topple Qasim," and for "grooming political leadership for a successor government." Bryan R. Gibson writes that "there is no documentation that ties the United States directly to any of Nasser's many covert attempts to overthrow the Qasim regime." However, Brandon Wolfe-Hunnicutt states that the U.S. issued its "tacit support for Egyptian efforts to bring [Qasim's government] down," and Kenneth Osgood writes that "circumstantial evidence in declassified records suggests that ... [t]he United States was working with Nasser on some level, even if the precise nature of that collaboration is not known." Contemporary documents pertaining to the CIA's operations in Iraq have remained classified or heavily redacted, thus "allow[ing] for plausible deniability."

Richard Sale of United Press International (UPI), citing former U.S. diplomat and intelligence officials, Adel Darwish, and other experts, reported that the unsuccessful October 7, 1959 assassination attempt on Qasim involving a young Saddam Hussein and other Ba'athist conspirators was a collaboration between the CIA and Egyptian intelligence. Gibson has disputed Sale and Darwish's account, concluding that available declassified records show that "while the United States was aware of several plots against Qasim, it had still adhered to [a] nonintervention policy." Wolfe-Hunnicutt observes that "[i]t seems more likely that it was October 7 that brought the Ba'ath to the attention of the US government." On the other hand, Osgood writes that "the circumstantial evidence is such that the possibility of US–UAR collaboration with Ba'ath Party activists cannot be ruled out," concluding that: "Whatever the validity of [Sale's] charges, at the very least currently declassified documents reveal that US officials were actively considering various plots against Qasim and that the CIA was building up assets for covert operations in Iraq."

The assassins, including Saddam, escaped to Cairo, Egypt "where they enjoyed Nasser's protection for the remainder of Qasim's tenure in power." One of the conspirators involved in the assassination attempt, Hazim Jawad, "received training from the UAR intelligence service in clandestine wireless telegraphy," before returning to Iraq in 1960 to coordinate "clandestine radio operations for the UAR." Wolfe-Hunnicutt writes that in the 1959–1960 period, during the "peak of US-UAR intelligence collaboration ... [i]t is quite possible that Jawad became familiar to US intelligence," as a 1963 State Department cable described him as "one of our boys." Similarly, it is possible that Saddam visited the U.S. embassy in Cairo, and some evidence suggests that he was "in frequent contact with US officials and intelligence agents." A former high-ranking U.S. official told Marion Farouk–Sluglett and Peter Sluglett that Iraqi Ba'athists, including Saddam, "had made contact with the American authorities in the late 1950s and early 1960s."

==== 1959–1963: South Vietnam ====
In 1959 a branch of the Worker's Party of Vietnam was formed in the south of the country and began an insurgency against the Republic of Vietnam (South Vietnam). They were supplied through Group 559, which was formed the same year by North Vietnam to send weapons down the Ho Chi Minh trail. The US supported the RoV against the communists. After the 1960 US election, President John F. Kennedy became much more involved with the fight against the insurgency.

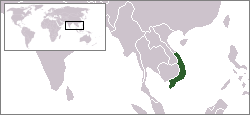
Location of South Vietnam

From mid-1963, the Kennedy administration became increasingly frustrated with South Vietnamese President Ngo Dinh Diem's repressive rule and his perceived persecution of the Buddhists. In light of Diem's refusal to adopt reforms, American officials debated whether they should support efforts to replace him. These debates crystallized after the ARVN Special Forces, which took their orders directly from the palace, raided Buddhist temples across the country, leaving a death toll estimated in the hundreds, and resulted in the dispatch of Cable 243 on August 24, 1963, which instructed United States Ambassador to South Vietnam, Henry Cabot Lodge Jr., to "examine all possible alternative leadership and make detailed plans as to how we might bring about Diem's replacement if this should become necessary". Lodge and his liaison officer, Lucien Conein, contacted discontented Army of the Republic of Vietnam officers and gave assurances that the US would not oppose a coup or respond with aid cuts. These efforts culminated in a coup d'état on November 1–2, 1963, during which Diem and his brother were assassinated. By the end of 1963 the Viet Cong switched to a much more aggressive strategy in fighting the Southern government and the US.

The Pentagon Papers concluded that "Beginning in August of 1963 we variously authorized, sanctioned and encouraged the coup efforts of the Vietnamese generals and offered full support for a successor government. In October we cut off aid to Diem in a direct rebuff, giving a green light to the generals. We maintained clandestine contact with them throughout the planning and execution of the coup and sought to review their operational plans and proposed new government."

==== 1959–1962: Cuba ====
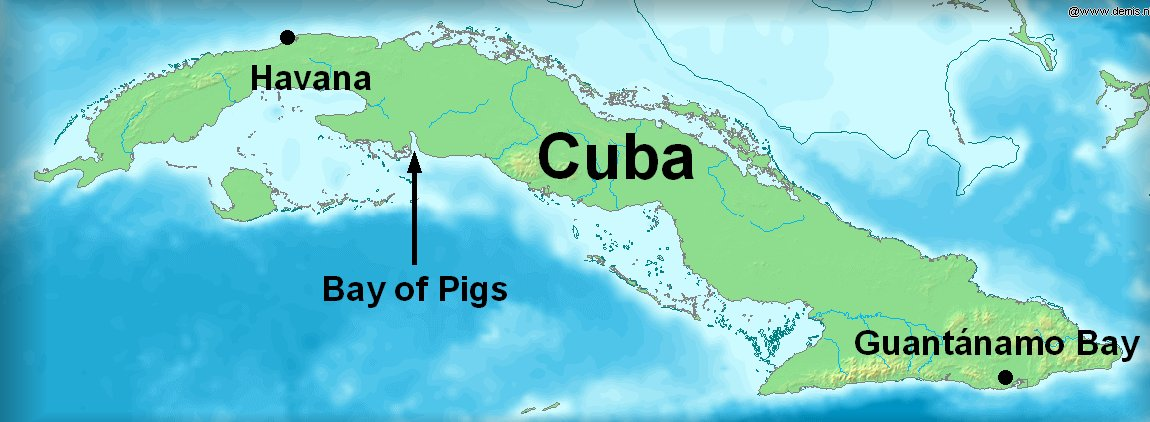
Location of Bay of Pigs in Cuba

Fulgencio Batista was a military dictator who seized power in Cuba in March 1952 via a coup d'état and was backed by the U.S. government until March 1958. His regime was overthrown on December 31, 1958, thus bringing an end to the Cuban Revolution that was led by Fidel Castro and his 26th of July Movement. Castro became president in February 1959. The CIA backed a force composed of CIA-trained Cuban exiles to invade Cuba with support and equipment from the US military, in an attempt to overthrow Castro's government. The invasion was launched in April 1961, three months after John F. Kennedy assumed the presidency in the United States, but the Cuban armed forces defeated the invading combatants within three days.

Operation MONGOOSE was a year-long U.S. government effort to overthrow the government of Cuba. The operation included an embargo against Cuba, "to induce failure of the Communist regime to supply Cuba's economic needs", a diplomatic initiative to isolate Cuba, and psychological operations "to turn the peoples' resentment increasingly against the regime." The economic warfare prong of the operation also included the infiltration of CIA operatives to carry out many acts of sabotage against civilian targets, such as a railway bridge, a molasses storage facilities, an electric power plant, and the sugar harvest, notwithstanding Cuba's repeated requests to the United States government to cease its armed operations. In addition, the CIA planned a number of assassination attempts against Fidel Castro, head of government of Cuba, including attempts that entailed CIA collaboration with the American mafia. In April 2021, documents released by the National Security Archive showed that the CIA was also involved in a plot to assassinate Raúl Castro in 1960.

==== 1959: Cambodia ====
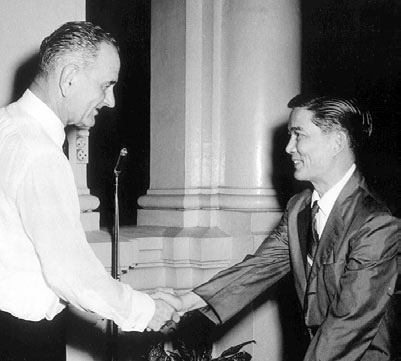
Ngô Đình Nhu meeting US vice president Lyndon Johnson in 1961

In December 1958, Ngô Đình Nhu, who was the younger brother and chief adviser of Ngo Dinh Diem (the president of South Vietnam), broached the idea of a coup (Bangkok Plot) to overthrow Cambodian leader Norodom Sihanouk. Nhu contacted Dap Chhuon, Sihanouk's Interior Minister, who was known for his pro-American sympathies, to prepare for the coup against his boss. Chhuon received covert financial and military assistance from Thailand, South Vietnam, and the CIA. In January 1959 Sihanouk learned of the coup plans through intermediaries who were in contact with Chhuon. The following month, Sihanouk sent the army to capture Chhuon, who was summarily executed as soon as he was captured, effectively ending the coup attempt. Sihanouk then accused South Vietnam and the U.S. of planning the coup attempt. Six months later, on 31 August 1959, a small packaged lacquer gift, which was fitted with a parcel bomb, was delivered to the royal palace. An investigation traced the origin of the parcel bomb to an American military base in Saigon. While Sihanouk publicly accused Ngo Dinh Nhu of masterminding the bomb attack, he secretly suspected that the U.S. was also involved. The incident deepened his distrust of the U.S.

=== 1960s ===
==== 1960–1965: Congo-Leopoldville ====
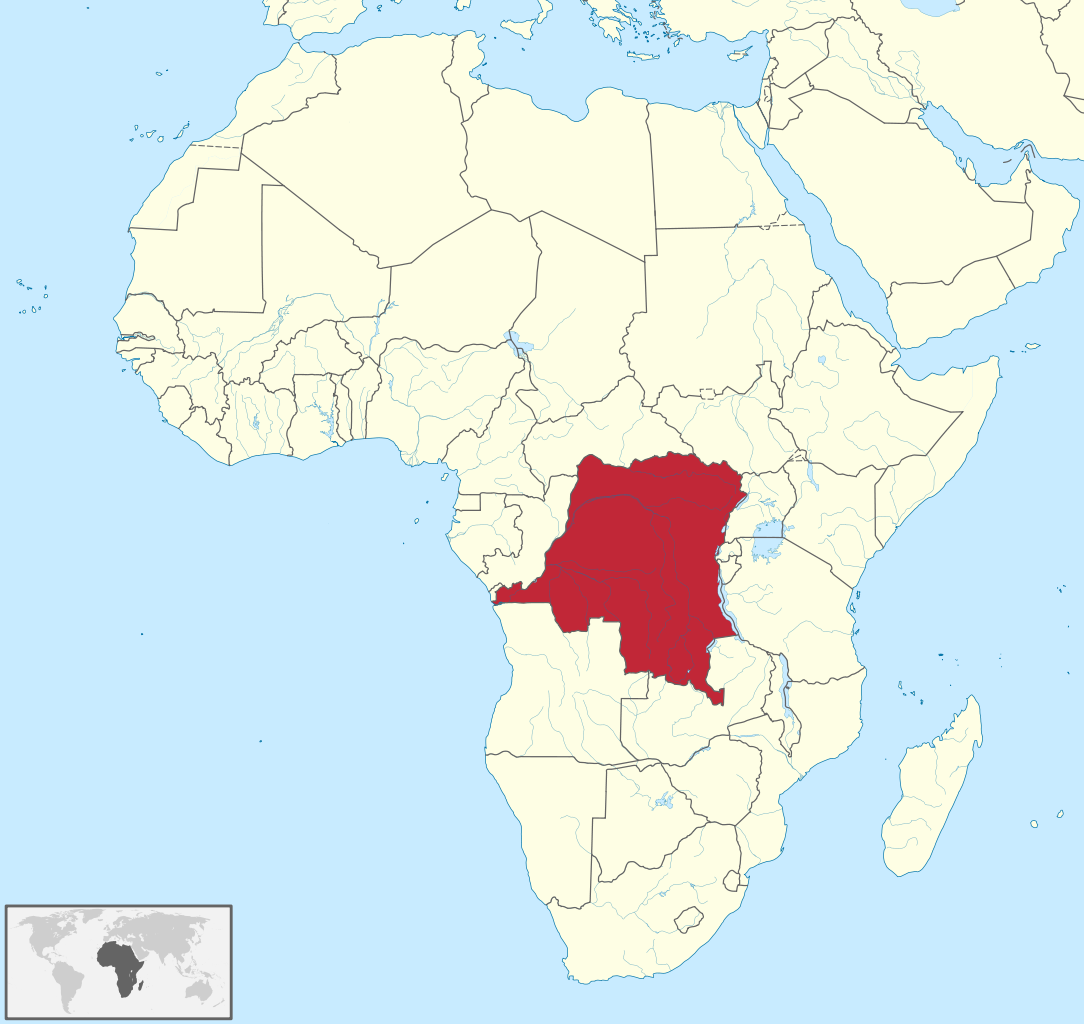

Patrice Lumumba was elected the first Prime Minister of the Republic of the Congo, now the Democratic Republic of the Congo, in May 1960, and in June 1960, the country achieved full independence from Belgium. In July, the Congo Crisis erupted with a mutiny among army, followed by the regions Katanga and South Kasai seceding with support from Belgium, who wished to keep power over resources in the region. Lumumba called in the United Nations to help him, but the U.N. force only agreed to keep peace and not stop the separatist movements. Lumumba then agreed to receive help from the USSR in order to stop the separatists, worrying the United States, due to the supply of uranium in the country. The CIA sent official Sydney Gottlieb with a poison to liaison with an African CIA asset code-named WI/Rogue who was to assassinate Lumumba, but Lumumba went into hiding before the operation was completed.

After Lumumba was killed, the US began funding Mobutu Sese Seko in order to secure him against the separatists and opposition. Many of Lumumba's supporters went east and formed the Free Republic of the Congo with its capital in Stanleyville in opposition to Mobutu's government. Eventually, the government in Stanleyville agreed to rejoin with the Leopoldville government under the latter's rule, however in 1963, Lumumba supporters formed another separate government in the east of the country and launched the Simba rebellion. The rebellion had support from the Soviet Union and many other countries in the Eastern Bloc. In November 1964, the U.S. and Belgium launched Operation Dragon Rouge to rescue hostages taken by Simba rebels in Stanleyville. The operation was a success and expelled the Simba rebels from the city, leaving them in disarray. The Simbas were ultimately defeated the following year by the Congolese army.

After the March 1965 elections, Mobutu launched a second coup in November with the support of the U.S. and other powers. Mobutu Sese Seko claimed democracy would return in five years and he was popular initially. However, he instead took increasingly authoritarian powers eventually becoming the dictator of the country.

==== 1960: Laos ====
On August 9, 1960, Captain Kong Le with his Royal Lao Army paratroop battalion seized control of the administrative capital city of Vientiane in a bloodless coup on a "neutralist" platform with the stated aims of ending the civil war raging in Laos, ending foreign interference in the country, ending the corruption caused by foreign aid, and better treatment for soldiers. With CIA support, Field Marshal Sarit Thanarat, the Prime Minister of Thailand, set up a covert Royal Thai Armed Forces advisory group, called Kaw Taw. Kaw Taw together with the CIA backed a November 1960 counter-coup against the new Neutralist government in Vientiane, supplying artillery, artillerymen, and advisers to General Phoumi Nosavan, first cousin of Sarit. It also deployed the Police Aerial Reinforcement Unit (PARU) to operations within Laos, sponsored by the CIA. With the help of CIA front organization Air America to airlift war supplies and with other U.S. military assistance and covert aid from Thailand, General Phoumi Nosavan's forces captured Vientiane in November 1960.

==== 1961: Dominican Republic ====
In May 1961, the ruler of the Dominican Republic, Rafael Trujillo was killed with weapons supplied by the United States Central Intelligence Agency (CIA). An internal CIA memorandum states that a 1973 Office of Inspector General investigation into the assassination disclosed "quite extensive Agency involvement with the plotters." The CIA described its role in "changing" the government of the Dominican Republic as a 'success' in that it assisted in moving the Dominican Republic from a totalitarian dictatorship to a Western-style democracy." Juan Bosch, an earlier recipient of CIA funding, was elected president of the Dominican Republic in 1962 and was deposed in 1963.

==== 1963: Iraq ====
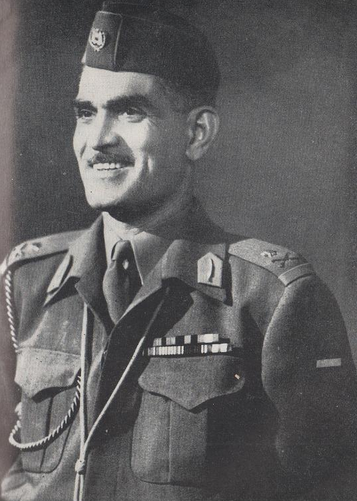
During the coup, the Ba'ath Party executed Iraq's prime minister, Brigadier Abd al-Karim Qasim (pictured), and desecrated his corpse on Iraqi television.

It has long been suspected that the Ba'ath Party collaborated with the CIA in planning and carrying out its violent coup that overthrew Iraq's leader, Brigadier Abd al-Karim Qasim, on February 8, 1963. Pertinent contemporary documents relating to the CIA's operations in Iraq have remained classified, and as of 2021 "[s]cholars are only beginning to uncover the extent to which the United States was involved in organizing the coup", but are "divided in their interpretations of American foreign policy." Bryan R. Gibson, writes that although "[i]t is accepted among scholars that the CIA ... assisted the Ba'th Party in its overthrow of [Qasim's] regime", that "barring the release of new information, the preponderance of evidence substantiates the conclusion that the CIA was not behind the February 1963 Ba'thist coup."

Peter Hahn argues that "[d]eclassified U.S. government documents offer no evidence to support" suggestions of direct U.S. involvement. On the other hand, Brandon Wolfe-Hunnicutt cites "compelling evidence of an American role," and that publicly declassified documents "largely substantiate the plausibility" of CIA involvement in the coup. Eric Jacobsen, citing the testimony of contemporary prominent Ba'athists and U.S. government officials, states that "[t]here is ample evidence that the CIA not only had contacts with the Iraqi Ba'th in the early sixties, but also assisted in the planning of the coup." Nathan J. Citino writes that "Washington backed the movement by military officers linked to the pan-Arab Ba‘th Party that overthrew Qasim", but that "the extent of U.S. responsibility cannot be fully established on the basis of available documents", and that "[a]lthough the United States did not initiate the 14 Ramadan coup, at best it condoned and at worst it contributed to the violence that followed."

Ba'athist leaders maintained supportive relationships with U.S. officials before, during, and after the coup. A March 1964 State Department memorandum would state that U.S. "officers assiduously cultivated" a "Baathi student organization, which triggered the revolution of February 8, 1963 by sponsoring a successful student strike at the University of Baghdad," and according to Wolfe-Hunnicutt, documents at the Kennedy Library suggest that the Kennedy administration viewed two prominent Ba'athist officials as "assets".

Senior National Security Council official Robert Komer wrote to President John F. Kennedy on February 8, 1963, that the Iraqi coup "is almost certainly a net gain for our side ... CIA had excellent reports on the plotting, but I doubt either they or UK should claim much credit for it." The U.S. offered material support to the new Ba'athist government after the coup, amidst an anti-Communist purge and Iraqi atrocities against Kurdish rebels and civilians, and while it is unlikely that the Ba'athists would've needed assistance in identifying Iraqi Communists, it is widely believed that the CIA provided the Ba'athist National Guard with lists of Communists and other leftists, who were then arrested or killed. Gibson emphasizes that the Ba'athists compiled their own lists, citing Bureau of Intelligence and Research reports. On the other hand, Citino and Wolfe-Hunnicutt consider the assertions plausible because the U.S. embassy in Iraq had actually compiled such lists, were known to be in contact with the National Guard during the purge, and because National Guard members involved in the purge received training in the U.S. Furthermore, Wolfe-Hunnicutt, citing contemporary U.S. counterinsurgency doctrine, notes that the assertions "would be consistent with American special warfare doctrine" regarding U.S. covert support to anti-Communist "Hunter-Killer" teams "seeking the violent overthrow of a communist dominated and supported government", and draws parallels to other CIA operations in which lists of suspected Communists were compiled, such as Guatemala in 1954 and Indonesia in 1965–66.

==== 1964: British Guiana (Guyana) ====
According to author John Prados, the CIA conducted a covert political campaign against left-wing Prime Minister of British Guiana Cheddi Jagan due to a fear of the spread of the Cuban Revolution across Latin America. The CIA supported trade unions during a strike against Jagan in 1963, and funded rival political parties during the 1964 election, while establishing the Justice Party as a CIA front. Political violence escalated, with nearly 200 murders and the bombing of Jagan's People's Progressive Party (PPP) headquarters.

==== 1964: Brazil ====

Since the Cuban Revolution, the United States started watching Latin America to keep any socialist governments out, and in 1961, when the Brazilian president Jânio Quadros resigned and the vice-president João Goulart assumed power after the scandal of the Legality Campaign, the United States started to get worried, as João Goulart had already shown sympathy for socialism, and slowly, the relationship between Brazil and the United States began deteriorating, with Washington getting favorable on inciting a coup d'état to oust him. When João Goulart started talking about an agrarian reform, many groups, especially in the military, started conspiring against him, with the idea of a coup d'état to overthrow him appearing and gaining force within the Brazilian population and military.

Political chaos ensued until the March of the Family with God for Liberty happened, of which many of those who opposed João Goulart went to the streets to protest against him. When the coup d'état broke out on March 31, 1964, the United States sent its Navy and Air Force to help the military rebels through Operation Brother Sam. When the coup d'état ended up being successful and João Goulart was overthrown, a right-wing military dictatorship assumed power and ended up running the country until March 1985. The United States would also go on to support the Brazilian military dictatorship through Operation Condor.

==== 1965–1967: Indonesia ====

Junior army officers and the commander of President Sukarno's palace guard accused senior Indonesian National Armed Forces officers of planning a CIA-backed coup against Sukarno and killed six senior generals on October 1, 1965, in what came to be called the 30 September Movement. The movement failed and subsequently the Communist Party of Indonesia (PKI) was accused of planning the killing of the six generals, as part of a propaganda campaign launched by the army. Civilian mobs were incited to attack those believed to be PKI supporters and other political opponents. Indonesian government forces with collaboration of some civilians perpetrated mass killings over many months. Scholars estimate the number of civilians killed range from a half million to over a million. US Ambassador Marshall Green encouraged the military leaders to act forcefully against the political opponents.

In 2017, declassified documents from the US Embassy in Jakarta have confirmed that the US had knowledge of, facilitated and encouraged mass killings for its own geopolitical interests. In 1990, US diplomats admitted to journalist Kathy Kadane that they had provided the Indonesian army with thousands of names of alleged PKI supporters and other alleged leftists, and that the U.S. officials then checked off from their lists those who had been killed. President Sukarno's base of support was largely annihilated or imprisoned and the remainder terrified, enabling him to be forced out of power in 1967, replaced by an authoritarian military regime led by Suharto. Historian John Roosa states that "almost overnight the Indonesian government went from being a fierce voice for cold war neutrality and anti-imperialism to a quiet, compliant partner of the US world order." This campaign is considered a major turning point in the Cold War, and was such a success that it served as a model for other U.S.-backed coups and anti-communist mass killings campaigns throughout Asia and Latin America.

==== 1966: Ghana ====
Some sources have alleged US and British involvement in the military coup that removed Kwame Nkrumah from power.

Some of the first allegations about United States involvement in the coup came from retired CIA officer John Stockwell in his 1978 book, In Search of Enemies.

In a footnote comment comparing the coup in Ghana to more recent operations in the Congo, Stockwell wrote:

This is the way the ouster of Nkrumah was handled in Ghana, 1966. The 40 Committee had met and rejected an agency proposal to oust Nkrumah. The Accra station was nevertheless encouraged by headquarters to maintain contact with dissidents of the Ghanaian army for the purpose of gathering intelligence on their activities. It was given a generous budget, and maintained intimate contact with the plotters as a coup was hatched. So close was the station's involvement that it was able to coordinate the recovery of some classified Soviet military equipment by the United States as the coup took place. The station even proposed to headquarters through back channels that a squad be on hand at the moment of the coup to storm the Chinese embassy, kill everyone inside, steal their secret records, and blow up the building to cover the fact. This proposal was quashed, but inside CIA headquarters the Accra station was given full, if unofficial credit for the eventual coup, in which eight Soviet advisors were killed. None of this was adequately reflected in the agency's written records.

Historian John Prados has written that it has not been verified that the CIA had any role in directing the coup, though they were aware of the tensions which were rising between the Ghana military and the Nkrumah government. CIA operative Howard Bane even claimed in February 1966 that a string of coups which had occurred in other African nations were also motivating the Ghana military to topple Nkrumah.

Memoranda released in 2001 suggest that the United States and United Kingdom discussed a plan "to induce a chain reaction eventually leading to Nkrumah's downfall." Relevant files from the British intelligence service, MI6, remain (as of 2009) classified.

Britain and the United States began discussions of regime change in Ghana in 1961. Details of plans from this time are mostly unknown, since declassified documents from this period remain censored. One such plot involved Finance Minister K.A. Gbedemah, who secured CIA and State Department support for a plan to overthrow Nkrumah—but was detected by the national intelligence service.

Central Intelligence Agency interest in Ghana increased again in 1964, when Director of Central Intelligence John A. McCone began participating in high-level meetings to discuss future relations with the country. On 6 February 1964, U.S. Secretary of State Dean Rusk asked McCone to study the possibility of a government takeover led by J.A. Ankrah. McCone indicated on February 11 that such a policy might be pursued in cooperation with the British. On 26 February 1964, Nkrumah wrote to U.S. President Lyndon Johnson criticizing "two conflicting establishments" operating in Ghana.

There is the United States Embassy as a diplomatic institution doing formal diplomatic business with us; there is also the C.I.A. organisation which functions presumably within or outside this recognised body. This latter organisation, that is, the C.I.A., seems to devote all its attention to fomenting ill-will, misunderstanding and even clandestine and subversive activities among our people, to the impairment of the good relations which exist between our two Governments.

— Kwame Nkrumah, Letter to President Johnson, 26 February 1964

When in early 1965 Nkrumah requested financial assistance from the United States, the State Department turned him down and suggested he ask the IMF. Nevertheless, U.S. President Lyndon Johnson did agree to lend him financial aid for the Volta river projects. The U.S. was reluctant to negotiate with Nkrumah partly because they foresaw a coup d'état led by Otu, Ankrah, and Harlley. In April, the U.S. Embassy in Accra submitted a report to the State Department titled "Proposed United States Aid Posture toward a Successor Government to Nkrumah's."

A U.S. National Security Council memo from Robert Komer to McGeorge Bundy appraised the situation:

McGB—

FYI, we may have a pro-Western coup in Ghana soon. Certain key military and police figures have been planning one for some time, and Ghana’s deteriorating economic condition may provide the spark.

The plotters are keeping us briefed, and State thinks we’re more on the inside than the British. While we’re not directly involved (I’m told), we and other Western countries (including France) have been helping to set up the situation by ignoring Nkrumah’s pleas for economic aid. The new OCAM (Francophone) group’s refusal to attend any OAU meeting in Accra (because of Nkrumah’s plotting) will further isolate him. All in all, looks good.

RWK

— Robert W. Komer, Memorandum to McGeorge Bundy, 27 May 1965

Nkrumah himself feared for his life and felt great distress during this time. Diplomatic relations with the West seemed to deteriorate, with Nkrumah's publication of Neo-Colonialism: The Last Stage of Imperialism and his criticism of Britain's response to the secession of White Rhodesia. Nkrumah also resisted economic policies proposed in May 1965 by the International Monetary Fund and reasserted by the World Bank in September 1965.

=== 1970s ===
==== 1970–1979: Cambodia ====

Prince Norodom Sihanouk, who came to power by the 1955 parliamentary election, had for years kept the Kingdom of Cambodia out of the Vietnam War by being friendly with China and North Vietnam, and had integrated left wing parties into mainstream politics. A leftist uprising occurred in 1967 and the Khmer Rouge began an insurgency against the prince the following year. Following the 1968 Tet Offensive, Sihanouk became convinced that North Vietnam was going to lose the war so he improved relations with the United States. In March 1970, Sihanouk was deposed by right-wing General Lon Nol following a vote of no confidence in Cambodia's National Assembly, and in October 1970, the Khmer Republic was declared by Lon Nol, officially ending the Kingdom and starting a period of military dictatorship. The overthrow followed Cambodia's constitutional process and most accounts emphasize the primacy of Cambodian actors in Sihanouk's removal. Historians are divided about the extent of U.S. involvement in or foreknowledge of the ouster, but an emerging consensus posits some culpability on the part of U.S. military intelligence. There is evidence that "as early as late 1968" Lon Nol floated the idea of a coup to U.S. military intelligence to obtain U.S. consent and military support for action against Prince Sihanouk and his government.

The coup further destabilized the country and ushered in years of a civil war that from 1970 onwards, was being fought between Lon Nol's forces and the Khmer Rouge. Sihanouk created a government in exile called GRUNK which aligned itself with the Khmer Rouge to fight Lon Nol as a common enemy. To stop the Khmer Rouge from taking power in the country and also to disrupt North Vietnamese supply lines that passed through Cambodia, Richard Nixon and Henry Kissinger approved an intensified U.S. bombing in the countryside, in Operations Menu and Freedom Deal, causing mass civilian loss which the Khmer Rouge used to promote recruitment and gain the support of the CPK support. Later, Kissinger suggested that Sihanouk had approved this U.S. bombing of North Vietnamese targets in Cambodia as early as 1969, although this has been heavily disputed by other sources.

By 1973, the U.S. had already left Indochina after seeing its objectives in Vietnam becoming increasingly harder, leaving the weakened Khmer Republic to collapse on April 17, 1975, when Phnom Penh fell to the Khmer Rouge. After the fall of the Khmer Republic to the Khmer Rouge, the Khmer Rouge's leader Pol Pot was consolidated as the dictator of Cambodia, now renamed to Kampuchea. Because Sihanouk fought alongside the Khmer Rouge during the civil war, he was allowed to become Head of State, a ceremonial position, however when he returned to the country and saw the Cambodian genocide being perpetrated by the Khmer Rouge, he resigned. The Khmer Rouge did not accept this at first, but after some negotiation, they accepted, after that, Sihanouk was placed under house arrest until the Third Indochina War, when the Angkar permitted him to flee to China for safety.

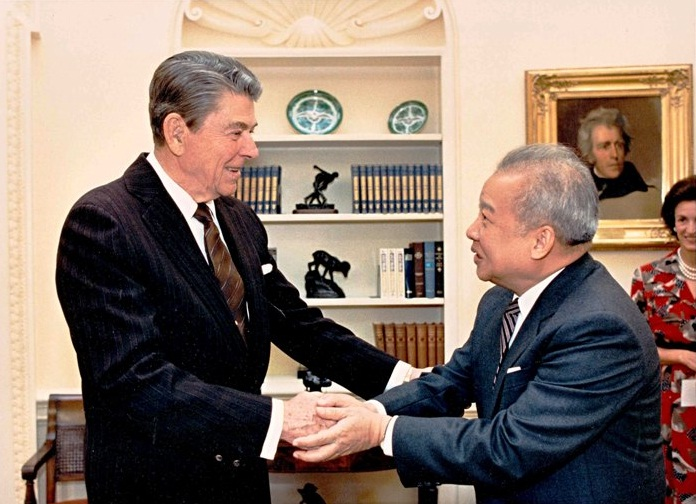
Norodom Sihanouk with U.S. President Ronald Reagan in the Oval Office in 1988. At the time, the U.S. still recognized the CGDK as the legitimate government of Kampuchea.

There are many accusations of the United States supposedly supporting Democratic Kampuchea during the Cambodian–Vietnamese War, because Vietnam was supported by the Soviet Union, and the United States chose to support Vietnam's enemy, in this case Democratic Kampuchea. However, these claims are without support. Despite these responses, it is documented that the United States provided diplomatic support to the Khmer Rouge by continuously voting for Democratic Kampuchea and later the CGDK to retain its seat at the UN, both immediately after its ousting as well as after it joined the coalition. This was because the Vietnamese-established People's Republic of Kampuchea was a client state of Vietnam and more importantly, a Soviet-aligned state.

==== 1970–1973: Chile ====

The U.S. government ran a psy ops action in Chile from 1963 until the coup d'état in 1973, and the CIA was involved in every Chilean election during that time. In the 1964 Chilean presidential election, the U.S. government supplied $2.6 million in funding to Christian Democratic Party presidential candidate Eduardo Frei Montalva, to prevent Salvador Allende and the Socialist Party of Chile winning. The U.S. also used the CIA to provide $12 million in funding to business interests for use in harming Allende's reputation.Kristian C. Gustafson wrote:

It was clear the Soviet Union was operating in Chile to ensure Marxist success, and from the contemporary American point of view, the United States was required to thwart this enemy influence: Soviet money and influence were clearly going into Chile to undermine its democracy, so U.S. funding would have to go into Chile to frustrate that pernicious influence.

Prior to Allende's inauguration, chief of staff of the Chilean Army, René Schneider, a general dedicated to preserving the constitutional order and considered "a major stumbling block for military officers seeking to carry out a coup", was targeted in a failed CIA backed kidnapping attempt by General Camilo Valenzuela on October 19, 1970. Schneider was killed three days later in another botched kidnapping attempt led by General Roberto Viaux. After the inauguration, there followed an extended period of social and political unrest between the right-dominated Congress of Chile and Allende, as well as economic warfare waged by Washington. U.S. President Richard Nixon had promised to "make the economy scream" to "prevent Allende from coming to power or to unseat him". On September 11, 1973, President Allende was overthrown by the Chilean Armed Forces and National Police, bringing to power the regime of Augusto Pinochet. The CIA, through Project FUBELT (also known as Track II), worked secretly to prepare the conditions for the coup. While the U.S. initially denied any involvement, many relevant documents have been declassified in the decades since.

According to historian Sebastián Hurtado Torres, there is no documentary evidence to support that the United States government acted actively in the coordination and execution of the coup actions by the Chilean Armed Forces from September 11, 1973 itself. However, Richard Nixon's interest from the beginning was that the Allende government would not be consolidated and intervened in the conditions prior to the Chilean coup of 1973. Historian Peter Winn found "extensive evidence" of United States complicity in events that helped in part to create the conditions that led to the coup. However, given the local political polarization and the performance of the Popular Unity government, there is no academic consensus on whether this intervention—which primarily took the form of financial support for the media, political parties, and opposition organizations—played a decisive role in the events of September 11, 1973.

==== 1971: Bolivia ====

The U.S. government supported the 1971 coup led by General Hugo Banzer that toppled President Juan José Torres of Bolivia, who had himself come to power in a coup the previous year. Torres was kidnapped and assassinated in 1976 as part of Operation Condor.

==== 1974–1991: Ethiopia ====
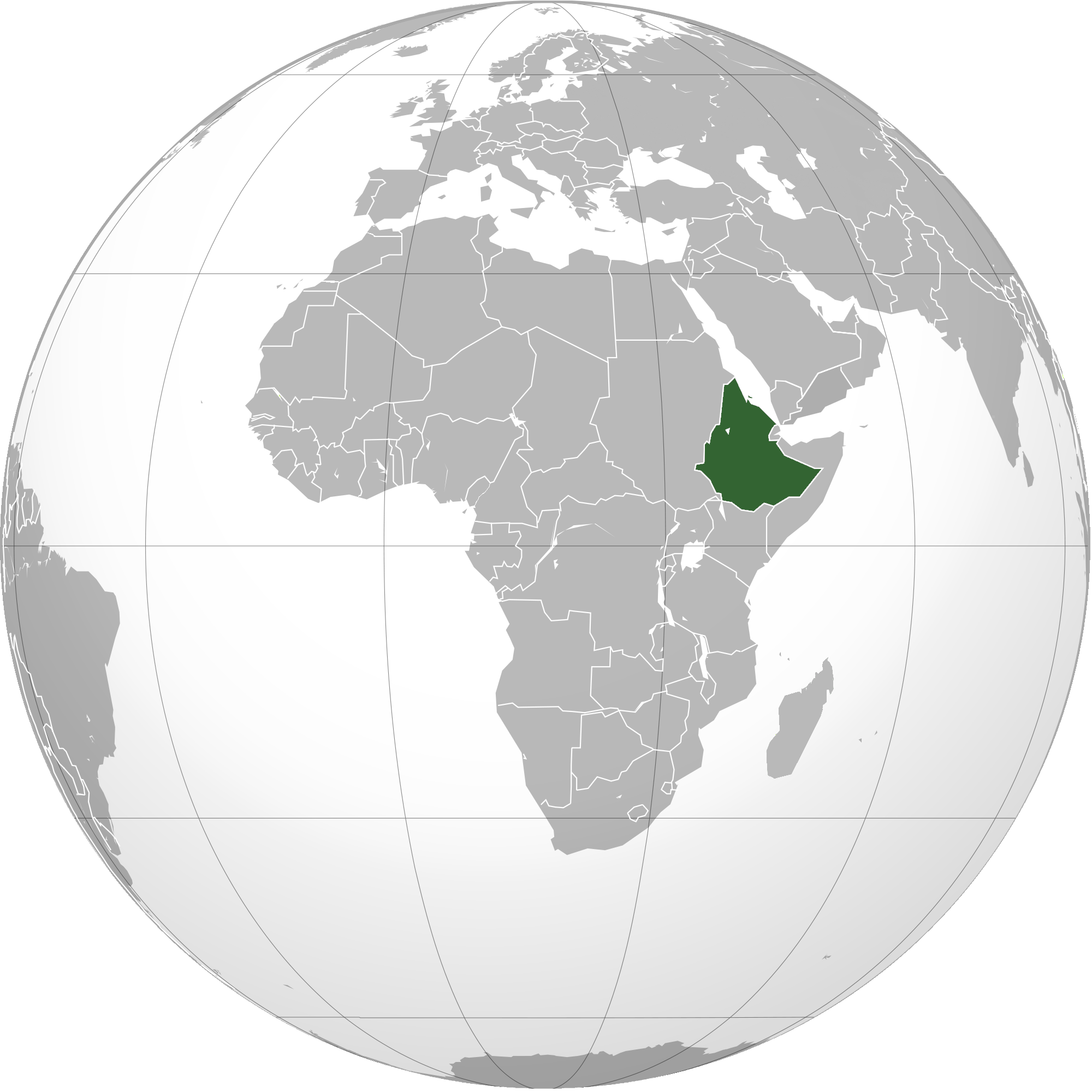
Ethiopia pre-Eritrean independence

On September 12, 1974, Emperor Haile Selassie I of the Ethiopian Empire, a dynastic monarchy, was overthrown in a coup by the Derg, an organization set up by the Emperor to investigate the Ethiopian Armed Forces. The Derg, led by dictator Mengistu Haile Mariam, became Marxist–Leninist and aligned with the Soviet Union. Numerous rebel groups rose up against the Derg, including conservative, separatist groups, and other Marxist–Leninist groups. These groups would receive support from the United States.

In the late 1980s, the rebels and the Eritrean separatists began to make gains against the government. The Derg dissolved itself in 1987, establishing the People's Democratic Republic of Ethiopia (PDRE) under the Workers' Party of Ethiopia (WPE) in an attempt to maintain its rule. In 1990 the USSR stopped supporting the Ethiopian government as it started to collapse, while the United States continued to support the rebels. In 1991 Mengistu Halie Mariam resigned and fled as rebels of the Ethiopian People's Revolutionary Democratic Front (EPRDF), a coalition of left-wing ethnic rebel groups, took over. Despite the fact that the US opposed him, the US embassy helped Mariam escape to Zimbabwe. The PDRE was dissolved and replaced with the Tigray People's Liberation Front-led Transitional Government of Ethiopia, and a transition to parliamentary democracy began.

==== 1975: Australia ====
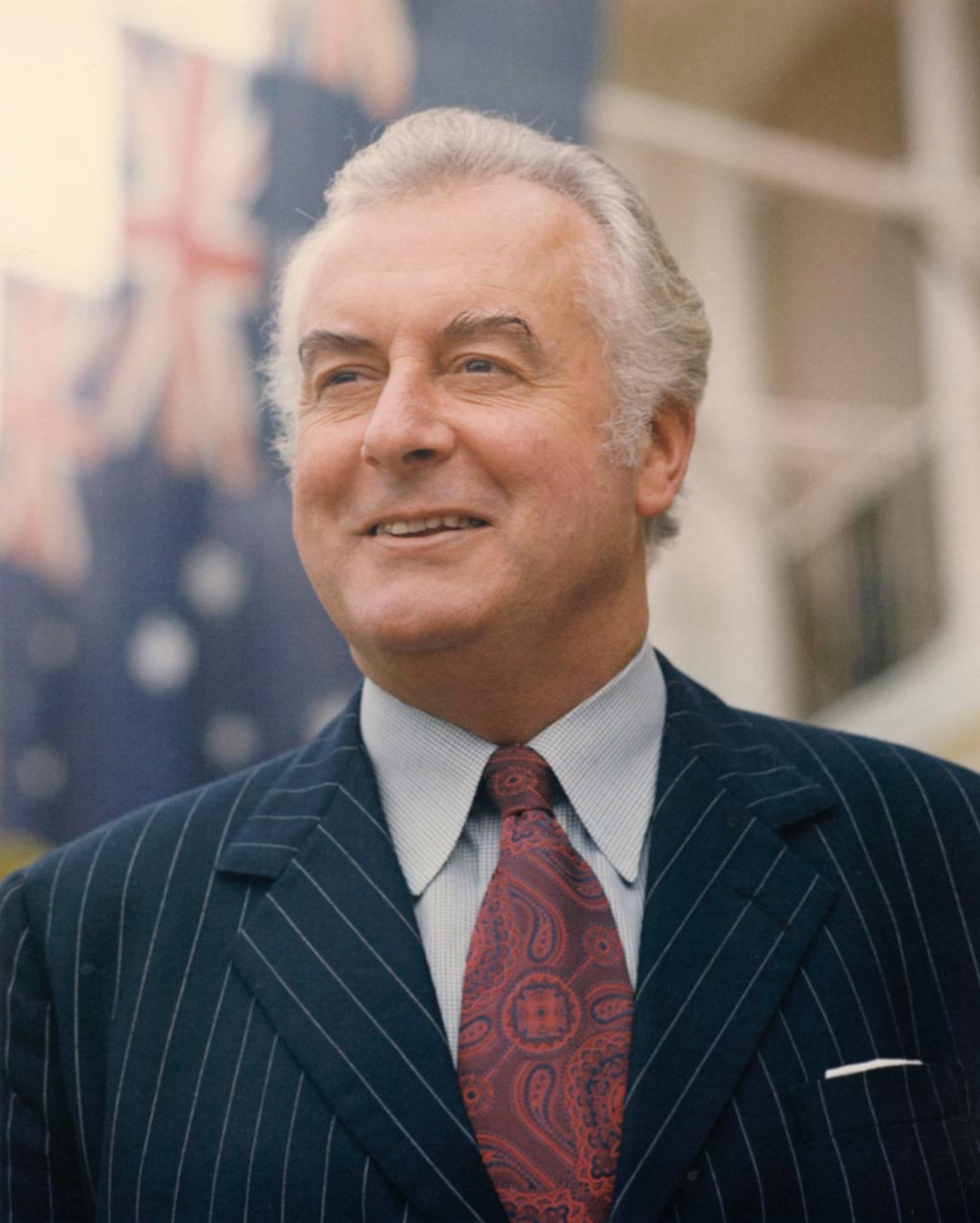
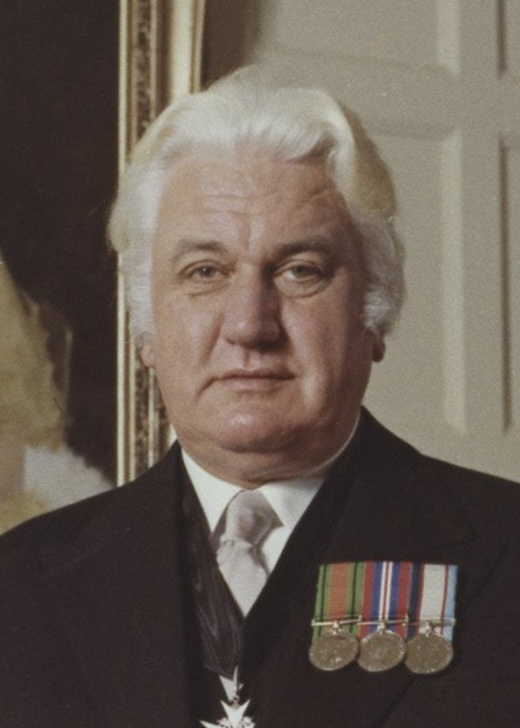
Australian Prime Minister Gough Whitlam (left) was dismissed by Governor-General John Kerr (right) amidst the 1975 Australian constitutional crisis. It has since been alleged the CIA was involved in the dismissal of Whitlam.

It is alleged that the United States Central Intelligence Agency (CIA) was involved with the events leading up to the 1975 Australian constitutional crisis, in which Prime Minister of Australia Gough Whitlam was dismissed by Governor-General of Australia John Kerr, who had several ties to the CIA and its predecessor.

CIA contractor and convicted Soviet spy Christopher John Boyce, several authors, including John Pilger, as well as some Australian politicians, allege that the CIA backed Kerr to dismiss Whitlam, due to Whitlam's perceived left-wing policies including Australian withdrawal from the Vietnam War, as well as his views on Australian sovereignty. His conflict with the CIA is alleged to have come to a head when he discovered several CIA-led operations occurring in Australia and overseas conducted by ASIO and ASIS, leading him to threaten cancellation of the lease on the Pine Gap facility, ending the US-led (nominally joint) operation, which was integral to the CIA's signals interception operations in the southern hemisphere.

Whitlam's threat to not renew the lease on the Pine Gap facility was allegedly seen by the CIA as compromising the integrity of intelligence operations pertaining to the satellite projects Rhyolite (subsequently Aquacade) and Argus (a proposed successor, later cancelled), used for monitoring and surveillance of missile launch sites in the Soviet Union and China, which were unknown to the Australian government at the time despite a blanket sharing agreement between the two countries.

Kerr denied any CIA involvement and Whitlam said Kerr did not need any encouragement from the CIA to sack him. Kerr allegedly maintained several links to CIA-funded organisations such as LawAsia and the magazine Quadrant, and was referred to as "Our Man" by the CIA according to whistle-blower and leaker Christopher John Boyce.

The action of an unelected representative sacking an elected prime minister and replacing them with a caretaker prime minister was referred to by Australian Labor Party and former Member of the House of Representatives Peter Staples as "the most blatant act of external interference in Australia's affairs and its autonomy as a nation and a democracy".

==== 1975–1991: Angola ====
Beginning in the 1960s, a rebellion broke out against Portuguese colonial rule in the Angolan War of Independence, mainly involving rebel groups the People's Movement for the Liberation of Angola (MPLA) and the National Liberation Front of Angola (FNLA). In 1974, the Portuguese regime of the New State was depose in the Carnation Revolution. The new government promised to give independence to its colonies including Angola. On January 15, 1975, Portugal signed the Alvor Agreement giving independence to Angola and establishing a transitional government including the MPLA, FNLA and National Union for the Total Independence of Angola (UNITA). The transitional government consisted of the Portuguese High Commissioner, ruling with a Prime Ministerial Council (PMC) made up of three representatives, one from each Angolan party to the agreement, with a rotating premiership among the representatives; however, the various independence groups started fighting one another. The MPLA was a leftist group that was advancing upon the other two main rebel groups, the FNLA and UNITA, the latter led by Jonas Savimbi, a former FNLA fighter and Maoist who eventually became a capitalist ideologically and made UNITA into a capitalist militant group.

The United States covertly supported UNITA and the FNLA through Operation IA Feature. President Gerald Ford approved of the program on July 18, 1975, while receiving dissent from officials in the CIA and State Department. Nathaniel Davis, Assistant Secretary of State, quit because of his disagreement with this. This program began as the war for independence was ending and continued as the civil war began in November 1975. The funding initially started at $6 million but then added $8 million on July 27 and added $25 million in August. The program was exposed and condemned by Congress in 1976. The Clark Amendment was added to the US Arms Export Control Act of 1976 ending the operation and restricting involvement in Angola. Despite this CIA Director George H.W. Bush conceded that some aid to the FNLA and UNITA continued.

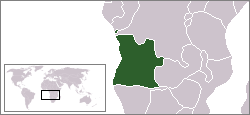
Location of Angola

In 1986, Ronald Reagan articulated the Reagan Doctrine, which called for the funding of anti-Communist forces across the world to "roll back" Soviet influence. The Reagan Administration lobbied Congress to repeal the Clark Amendment, which eventually occurred on July 11, 1985. In 1986, the war in Angola became a major Cold War proxy conflict. Savimbi's conservative allies in the US lobbied for increased support to UNITA. In 1986 Savimbi visited the White House and afterwards Reagan approved the shipment of Stinger Surface-to-Air Missiles as a part of $25 million in aid.

After George H. W. Bush became president, aid to Savimbi continued. Savimbi began relying on the company Black, Manafort, and Stone in order to lobby for assistance. They lobbied the H. W. Bush administration for increased assistance and weapons to UNITA. Savimbi also met with Bush himself in 1990. In 1991, the MPLA and UNITA signed the Bicesse Accords ending US and Soviet involvement in the war, initiating multi-party elections and establishing the Republic of Angola, while South Africa withdrew from Namibia.

==== 1975–1999: East Timor ====
On December 7, 1975, nine days after declaring independence from Portugal, East Timor was invaded by Indonesia. Whilst it was under the pretext of anti-colonialism, the actual aim of the invasion was to overthrow the Fretilin regime that emerged the previous year. The day before the invasion, U.S. President Gerald Ford and Secretary of State, Henry Kissinger met with General Suharto, who told them of his intention to invade East Timor. Ford replied, "[W]e will understand and not press you on the issue. We understand the problem you have and the intentions you have." Ford endorsed the invasion as he saw East Timor as of little significance, overshadowed by Indonesia–United States relations. The fall of Saigon earlier in 1975 had left Indonesia as the most significant U.S. ally in Southeast Asia, so Ford reasoned that it was in the national interest to side with Indonesia.

American weapons were crucial to Indonesia during the invasion, with the majority of military equipment used by Indonesian military units involved being U.S. supplied. United States military aid to Indonesia continued during its occupation of East Timor, which ended in 1999 with East Timor's independence referendum. In 2005, the final Commission for Reception, Truth and Reconciliation in East Timor wrote that "[U.S.] political and military support were fundamental to the invasion and occupation of East Timor".

==== 1976: Argentina ====
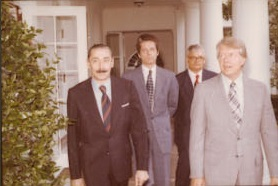
Jorge Rafael Videla meeting Jimmy Carter in 1977

The Argentine Armed Forces overthrew President Isabel Perón, elected in the 1973 presidential election, in the 1976 Argentine coup d'état, starting the military dictatorship of General Jorge Rafael Videla known as the National Reorganization Process until 1983. Both the coup and the following authoritarian regime were endorsed and supported by the U.S. government with Henry Kissinger paying several official visits to Argentina during the dictatorship. Videla and Emilio Eduardo Massera (a military officer and leading participant in the coup) were graduates of the School of Americas, which according to Congressman Joseph P. Kennedy II was "...a school that has run more dictators than any other school in the history of the world."

==== 1979–1992: Afghanistan ====

In 1978, the Saur Revolution brought the Democratic Republic of Afghanistan to power, a one-party state backed by the Soviet Union. In what was known as Operation Cyclone, the U.S. government provided weapons and funding for a collection of warlords and several factions of jihadi guerrillas known as the Afghan mujahideen fighting to overthrow the Afghan government. The program began modestly with $695,000 in nominally "non-lethal" aid to the mujahideen on July 3, 1979, and escalated following the December 1979 Soviet invasion of Afghanistan.

Through the Inter-Services Intelligence (ISI) of neighboring Pakistan the U.S. channeled training, weapons, and money for Afghan fighters. The first CIA-supplied weapons were antique British Lee–Enfield rifles shipped out in December 1979, but by September 1986 the program included U.S.-origin state of the art weaponry, such as FIM-92 Stinger surface-to-air missiles, some 2,300 of which were ultimately shipped into Afghanistan.

Afghan Arabs also "benefited indirectly from the CIA's funding, through the ISI and resistance organizations." Some of the CIA's greatest Afghan beneficiaries were Islamist commanders such as Jalaluddin Haqqani and Gulbuddin Hekmatyar, who were key allies of Osama bin Laden over many years. Some of the CIA-funded militants would become part of al-Qaeda later on, and included bin Laden, according to former Foreign Secretary Robin Cook and other sources. Despite these and similar allegations, there is no direct evidence of CIA contact with bin Laden or his inner circle during the Soviet–Afghan War. The US also partially funded the radicalization of Afghan refugees in Madrasas like Darul Uloom Haqqania in Pakistan, whose alumni would later found groups like the Taliban.

U.S. support for the mujahideen ended in January 1992 pursuant to an agreement reached with the Soviets in September 1991 on ending external interference in Afghanistan by either side. By 1992, the combined U.S., Saudi, and Chinese aid to the mujahideen was estimated at $6–12 billion, whereas Soviet military aid to Afghanistan was valued at $36–48 billion. The result was a heavily armed, militarized Afghan society: Some sources indicate that Afghanistan was the world's top destination for personal weapons during the 1980s.

=== 1980s ===
==== 1980–1989: Poland ====

Since the 1952 Constitution, Poland was a one-party Communist state, the Polish People's Republic. In the 1980s, opposition to it crystallised in the Solidarity trade union, founded in 1980. The Reagan administration supported the Solidarity, and—based on CIA intelligence—waged a public relations campaign to deter what the Carter administration felt was "an imminent move by large Soviet military forces into Poland." On November 4, 1982, President Reagan, after a brief discussion with the National Security Planning Group, signed an executive order to provide money and non-lethal aid to Polish opposition groups: the operation was code-named QRHELPFUL. Michael Reisman and James E. Baker named operations in Poland as one of the covert actions of the CIA during Cold War. Colonel Ryszard Kukliński, a senior officer on the Polish General Staff was secretly sending reports to the CIA.

The CIA transferred around $2 million yearly in cash to Solidarity, for a total of $10 million over five years. There were no direct links between the CIA and Solidarność, and all money was channeled through third parties. CIA officers were barred from meeting Solidarity leaders, and the CIA's contacts with Solidarność activists were weaker than those of the AFL–CIO, which raised $300,000 from its members, which were used to provide material and cash directly to Solidarity, with no control of Solidarity's use of it. The U.S. Congress authorized the National Endowment for Democracy to promote democracy, and the NED allocated $10 million to Solidarity.

When the Polish government launched martial law in December 1981, however, Solidarity was not alerted. Potential explanations for this vary; some believe that the CIA was caught off guard, while others suggest that American policy-makers viewed an internal crackdown as preferable to an "inevitable Soviet intervention." CIA support for Solidarity included money, equipment and training, which was coordinated by Special Operations. Henry Hyde, U.S. House intelligence committee member, stated that the US provided "supplies and technical assistance in terms of clandestine newspapers, broadcasting, propaganda, money, organizational help and advice". Initial funds for covert actions by the CIA were $2 million, but soon after authorization were increased and by 1985 the CIA successfully infiltrated Poland.

==== 1981–1982: Chad ====
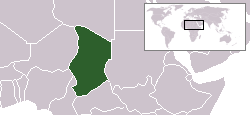

In 1975 as part of the First Chadian Civil War, the military overthrew François Tombalbaye and installed Félix Malloum as head of state. Hissène Habré was appointed Prime minister, and attempted to overthrow the government in February 1979, failing, and being forced out. In 1979 Malloum resigned and Goukouni Oueddei became head of state. Oueddei agreed to share power with Habré, appointing him Minister of Defense, but fighting resumed soon after. Habré was exiled to Sudan in 1980.

At the time the U.S. government wanted a bulwark against Muammar Gaddafi in Libya, and saw Chad, Libya's southern neighbor, as a good option. Chad and Libya had recently signed an agreement to attempt to end their border conflict and "to work to achieve full unity between the two countries", which the United States was against. The United States also saw Oueddei as too close to Gaddafi. Habre was already pro-western and pro-American, as well as against Oueddei. The Reagan administration gave him covert support through the CIA when he returned in 1981 to continue fighting, and he overthrew Goukouni Oueddi on June 7, 1982, making himself the new president of Chad. The CIA continued to support Habre after he took power, including training and equipping the Documentation and Security Directorate (DDS), Chad's notorious secret police. They also supported Chad in their 1986–1987 war against Libya.

==== 1981–1990: Nicaragua ====

In 1979, the Sandinista National Liberation Front (FSLN) overthrew the US-backed Somoza family. The Carter administration tried to be friendly with the new government, but the Reagan administration that came after in January 1981 had more aggressive and anti-Communist foreign policy. They immediately cut off aid to the Nicaraguan government, and in August 1981, Reagan signed National Security Decision Directive 7, which authorized the production and shipment of arms to the region but not their deployment. In November 1981 Reagan signed National Security Directive 17, which allowed covert support to anti-Sandinista forces.

The U.S. government armed, trained and funded the Contras, a group of rebel fighters based in Honduras, in an attempt to overthrow the Nicaraguan government. As part of the training, the CIA distributed a detailed manual entitled "Psychological Operations in Guerrilla War", which instructed the Contras, among other things, on how to blow up public buildings, to assassinate judges, to create martyrs, and to blackmail ordinary citizens. In addition to backing the Contras, the U.S. government also blew up bridges and mined harbors, causing the damaging of at least seven merchant ships and blowing up numerous Nicaraguan fishing boats. They also attacked Corinto harbor on October 10, 1983, causing 112 wounded according to the Nicaraguan government. After the Boland Amendment, passed in 1982, made it illegal for the U.S. government to provide funding for Contra activities, Reagan's administration secretly sold arms to the Iranian government to fund a secret U.S. government apparatus that continued illegally to fund the Contras, in what became known as the Iran–Contra affair. The U.S. continued to arm and train the Contras even after the Sandinista government of Nicaragua won the elections of 1984.

In April 1984, Nicaragua initiated proceedings against the U.S. at the International Court of Justice (ICJ) alleging that the U.S. violated international law for their support of the Contras and mining of harbors. Nicaragua argued that the U.S. had engaged in acts of aggression via surrogate forces to harm Nicaragua's economy and bring about regime change. The Nicaraguan government stated that economic cost of the war in 1984 alone was 255 million dollars and cited acts committed by the Contras such as closing of education and health care facilities, including a hospital, and the killing of health and education workers. The court ruled against the U.S. in June 1986 and awarded reparations to Nicaragua. However the Reagan administration had already announced in January 1985 that they would no longer be participating in the ICJ proceedings or consider itself bound by their ruling.

During the 1990 Nicaraguan general election campaign, the George H. W. Bush administration authorized 49.75 million dollars of non-lethal aid to the Contras. The war continued, with the Contras assassinating candidates and distributing leaflets promoting the opposition party UNO (National Opposition Union), who would win the election. The war ended soon afterwards. In 1992, the post-Sandinista government of Nicaragua withdrew the complaint from the ICJ and repealed the law that had required the country to seek compensation from the U.S.

==== 1983: Grenada ====

On October 25, 1983, the U.S. military and a coalition of six Caribbean nations invaded the nation of Grenada, codenamed Operation Urgent Fury, and successfully overthrew the Marxist government of Hudson Austin. The conflict was triggered by the killing of the previous leader of Grenada Maurice Bishop and the establishment of Hudson as the country's leader a week before on 19 October. The United Nations General Assembly called the U.S. invasion "a flagrant violation of international law", but a similar resolution widely supported in the United Nations Security Council was vetoed by the U.S.

==== 1989–1994: Panama ====

In 1979, the U.S. and Panama signed a treaty to end the Panama Canal Zone and promise that the U.S. would hand over the canal after 1999. Manuel Noriega ruled the country of Panama as a dictator. He was an ally of the United States working with them against the Sandinistas in Nicaragua and the FMLN in El Salvador. Despite this, relations began to deteriorate as he was implicated in the Iran–Contra scandal, including drug trafficking. As relations continued to deteriorate Noriega started to ally with the Eastern Bloc. This also worried US officials and government officials like Elliott Abrams started arguing with Reagan that the US should invade Panama. Reagan decided to hold off due to George H. W. Bush's ties to Noriega when he was the head of the CIA running his election, but after Bush was elected he started pressuring Noriega. Despite irregularities in the 1989 Panamanian general election, Noriega refused to allow the opposition candidate into power. Bush called on him to honor the will of the Panamanian people. Coup attempts were made against Noriega and skirmishes broke out between U.S. and Panamanian troops. Noriega was also indicted for drug charges in the United States. In December 1989, in a military operation code-named Operation Just Cause, the U.S. invaded Panama. Noriega went into hiding but was later captured by US forces. President-elect Guillermo Endara was sworn into office. The United States ended Operation Just Cause in January 1990 and began Operation Promote Liberty, which was the occupation of the country to set up the new government until 1994.

==== 1986–1991: Soviet Union ====

In 1983, the congressionally funded National Endowment for Democracy was established to promote democratic change in Communist states. Between 1984 and 1986, the foundation funded émigré journals that were smuggled into the Soviet Union. At a meeting of the organization in December 1986, Zbigniew Brzezinski proposed supporting nationalism and democratic aspirations among national and religious minorities such as Ukrainians, Muslims, and the Baltics in order to politically and economically decentralize the Soviet system. In 1989, sovietologist Richard Pipes suggested that the Bush administration "devise a long-term strategy for the decolonization of the inner Soviet empire", and Brzezinski argued that the Soviet Union should be transformed "into a genuinely voluntary confederation or commonwealth". The foundation channeled aid to groups in the Baltic States, Armenia, Russia, and Ukraine that sought greater independence from Gorbachev's central government.

Prior to the 1990 Russian parliamentary elections, NED funded an initiative by Paul Weyrich and the Free Congress Foundation to assist Boris Yeltsin and a group of democratic candidates and to create a "communications network". The foundation provided assistance to strengthen the independent press and to train democratic candidates in political techniques. The organization Democratic Russia received $2 million from the conservative Krieble Institute, with which Yeltsin's advisor Gennady Burbulis organized 120 workshops and seminars in Moscow, democracy trainings in Russian regions, and conferences in Tallinn. The money also bought computers and copy machines that were used during the referendum on March 17, 1991, as well as Yeltsin's election campaign. Yeltsin's campaign manager in 1991, Alexander Urmanov, received training from the Krieble Institute. The KGB knew about the foreign aid, but did nothing about it because the recipients of the money had parliamentary immunity and there was no law prohibiting Soviet parliamentarians from receiving foreign aid. Commenting on Yeltsin's victory in Russia's first democratic presidential election, Burbublis told Krieble: "Well, Bob, you did it."

== 1991–present day ==
=== 1990s ===
==== 1991: Iraq ====
Iraq (orthographic projection)

The United Nations Security Council (UNSC) imposed sanctions against Iraq in August 1990 under Resolution 661 to compel Iraq to withdraw from occupied Kuwait without the use of military force, but Iraq refused to withdraw its forces, leading to the 1991 Gulf War. During and immediately following the War, the United States broadcast signals encouraging an uprising against Saddam Hussein, an autocrat who had ruled Iraq since coming to power in an internal struggle in the ruling Ba'ath Party in 1979. On February 24, 1991, a few days after the ceasefire was signed, the CIA-funded radio station Voice of Free Iraq called for the Iraqi people to rise up against Hussein.

The day after the Gulf War ended on March 1, 1991, Bush again called for the overthrow of Saddam Hussein. The U.S. was hoping for a coup but instead, a series of uprisings erupted across Iraq right after the war. Two of the largest rebellions were led by the Iraqi Kurds in the North and the Shia militias in the south. Although George H.W. Bush said that the U.S. did not intend to assist any rebels, the rebels assumed that they would get direct U.S. support; however, the United States worried that if Saddam fell and Iraq collapsed, Iran would gain power. Colin Powell wrote of his time as Chairman of the Joint Chiefs of Staff "our practical intention was to leave Baghdad enough power to survive as a threat to an Iran that remained bitterly hostile toward the United States".

The Shia uprisings were crushed by the Iraqi military while the Peshmerga were more successful, gaining the Iraqi Kurds autonomy. After the war, the U.S. government successfully advocated that sanctions remain in effect with revisions, including linkage to removal of weapons of mass destruction, which the UNSC did in April 1991 by adopting Resolution 687, albeit with the earlier prohibition on foodstuffs lifted. U.S. officials stated in May 1991—when it was widely expected that the Iraqi government of Saddam Hussein faced collapse—that the sanctions would not be lifted unless Saddam was ousted. In the subsequent president's administration, U.S. officials did not explicitly insist on regime change but took the position that the sanctions could be lifted if Iraq complied with all of the UN resolutions it was violating (including those related to the country's human rights record) and not just with UN weapons inspections.

==== 1991: Haiti ====
Eight months after his election, President Jean-Bertrand Aristide was deposed by the Haitian Armed Forces. Many professors document that the CIA "paid key members of the coup regime forces, identified as drug traffickers, for information from the mid-1980s at least until the coup." Coup leaders Raoul Cédras and Michel François had received military training in the United States. While CIA officials expressed displeasure with Aristide and CIA informants placed CIA officers with the military at the time of the coup, the CIA denied involvement. Importantly, the U.S.-led Operation Uphold Democracy reinstated President Aristide after receiving approval for intervention by the United Nations Security Council and collaborating with other Caribbean nations.

==== 1992–1996: Iraq ====
The CIA launched DBACHILLES, a coup d'état operation against the Iraqi government, recruiting Ayad Allawi, who headed the Iraqi National Accord, a network of Iraqis who opposed the Saddam Hussein government, as part of the operation. The network included Iraqi military and intelligence officers but was penetrated by people loyal to the Iraqi government. Also using Ayad Allawi and his network, the CIA directed a government sabotage and bombing campaign in Baghdad between 1992 and 1995. The CIA bombing campaign may have been merely a test of the operational capacity of the CIA's network of assets on the ground and not intended to be the launch of the coup strike itself. However, Allawi attempted a coup against Saddam Hussein in 1996. The coup was unsuccessful, but Ayad Allawi was later installed as prime minister of Iraq by the Iraq Interim Governing Council, which had been created by the U.S.-led coalition following the March 2003 invasion and occupation of Iraq.

==== 1993: Russia ====
During the Russian constitutional crisis of 1993 and Black October, the Clinton administration gave full backing, encouragement and legitimacy to the Yeltsin government during their crackdown on the parliament, which has been criticized as a self-coup.

US Ambassador to Russia Thomas R. Pickering was informed about Yeltsin's intentions prior to his announcement to unconstitutionally dissolve the parliament by foreign minister Andrei Kozyrev. Following Yeltsin's announcement of dissolvement on 22 September 1993, President Clinton assured Yeltsin unwavering US support on a private phone call and publicly proclaimed "full support" for the Russian president. Secretary of State Warren Christopher urged Congress to approve another $2.5 Billion in economic aid to Russia. Christopher and the Clinton administration refused to comment on the legality of Yeltsin's actions, while some senior officials acknowledged the breach of the constitution, but still supported it. Clinton had already supported Yeltsin's unconstitutional establishment of a "special regime" (rule by decree) in March 1993, from which Yeltsin later backed off.

In a private call with Special Adviser Strobe Talbott, Pickering called the support for Yeltsin a "no-brainer" and based his support on Yeltsin's promises for free elections while also acknowledging that those actions were unconstitutional. Pickering added that the US regarded the Russian constitution as a leftover from the Soviet era and did not necessarily consider it a "democratic, legitimate document". It is possible that Pickering envoked his own personal interpretation of constitutionalism in judging the legitimacy of the constitution. This skepticism validated and encouraged Yeltsin in his position during the confrontation.

One day after the escalation and shelling of the parliament and arrest of the opposition on 4 October 1993, ending the constitutional crisis, Clinton called Yeltsin and congratulated him for the "superb handling".

On the 19 October 1993, US diplomat to Russia James Collins criticized Yeltsin's 1993 constitution proposal as a "half-baked document" that gave the executive branch a "preponderance of authority". Lawyers funded by USAID had contributed to the draft of the proposal. Yeltsin's constitution proposal was accepted via popular vote on 12 December 1993.

==== 1994–1995: Haiti ====
After a right-wing military junta took over Haiti in 1991 in a coup, the U.S. initially had good relations with the new government. George H. W. Bush's administration supported the right wing junta. However, after the 1992 U.S. general election Bill Clinton came to power. Clinton was supportive of returning Jean-Bertrand Aristide to power, and his administration was active for the return of democracy to Haiti. This culminated in United Nations Security Council Resolution 940, which authorized the United States to lead an invasion of Haiti and restore Aristide to power. A diplomatic effort was led by former U.S. president Jimmy Carter and former Chairman of the Joint Chiefs of Staff Colin Powell. The U.S. gave the Haitian government an ultimatum: either the dictator of Haiti, Raoul Cédras, retire peacefully and let Aristide come back to power, or be invaded and forced out. Cedras capitulated; however, he did not immediately disband the armed forces. Protesters fought the military and police. The U.S. sent in the military to stop the violence, and soon it was quelled. Aristide returned to lead the country in October 1994. Clinton and Aristide presided over ceremonies and Operation Uphold Democracy officially ended on March 31, 1995.

==== 1996–1997: Zaire ====
Due to the end of the Cold War, U.S. support for Mobutu Sese Seko in Zaire reduced. In 1990 the Rwandan Patriotic Front (FPR) invaded Rwanda, beginning the Rwandan Civil War, which culminated in the Rwandan genocide and caused over 1.5 million refugees to flee into Zaire, where fighting broke out between refugee and non-refugee Tutsis, Hutu refugees, and other ethnic groups. In response, Rwanda formed Tutsi militias in Zaire, causing tensions between the militias and the Zaire government leading to the Banyamulenge Rebellion on August 31, 1996, which led to the creation of Tutsi and non-Tutsi militias opposed to Mobutu into the Alliance of Democratic Forces for the Liberation of the Congo (AFDL), led by Laurent-Désiré Kabila.

The United States covertly supported Rwanda before and during the Congo war. The U.S. believed it was time for a "new generation of African leaders", such as Kagame and Yoweri Museveni in Uganda, which was part of the reason the U.S. had previously stopped supporting Mobutu. The U.S. sent soldiers to train the FPR and brought FPR commanders to the U.S. as well before the war in 1995 for training. During the war, rebels in Bukavu were joined by a group of African–American mercenaries, who claimed they had been recruited in an unofficial U.S. mission. The CIA and U.S. army set up communications in Uganda, and during the war, several aircraft landed in Kigali and Entebbe, claiming to be bringing "aid for the genocide victims"; however, it has been alleged that they were bringing military and communication supplies for the FPR. At the same time, U.S. operated anti-Mobutu support from the International Rescue Committee (IRC).

=== 2000s ===
==== 2000: FR Yugoslavia ====
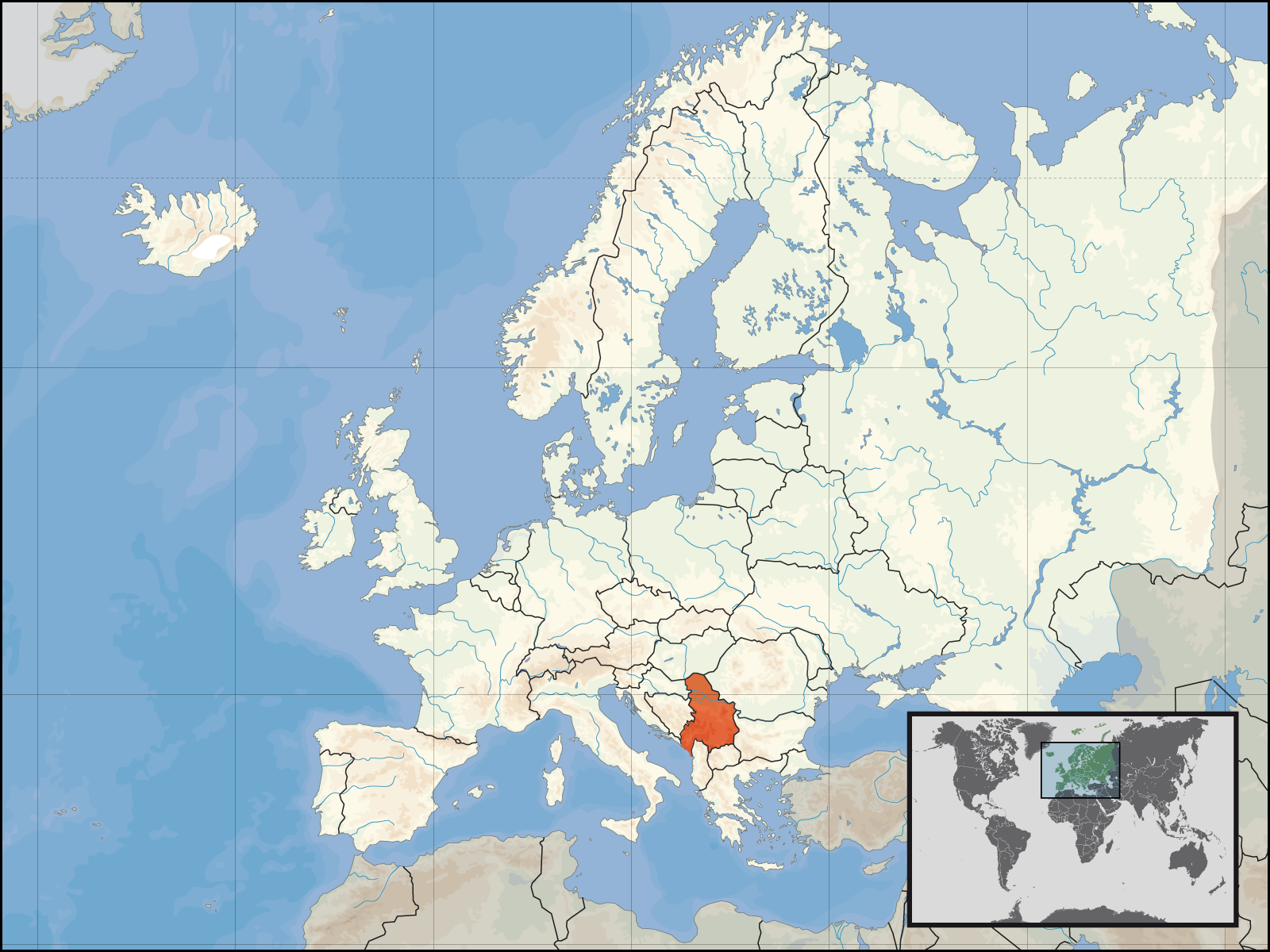

In the run-up to the 2000 Yugoslavian general election, the U.S. State Department actively supported opposition groups such as Otpor through the supply of promotional material and consulting services via Quangos. United States involvement served to speed up and organize dissent through exposure, resources, moral and material encouragement, technological aid and professional advice. This campaign was one of the factors contributing to the incumbent president's defeat in the 2000 Yugoslavian general election and subsequent Bulldozer Revolution which overthrew Milošević on October 5, 2000, after he refused to recognise the results of the election. In addition, President Bill Clinton authorized CIA involvement in the election to prevent Milošević's victory. The agency funneled "certainly millions of dollars" into the campaign against the Serbian leader domestically and also organized meetings of opposition members abroad.

==== 2001–2021: Afghanistan ====

Since 1996, Afghanistan had been under the control of the Taliban-led Islamic Emirate of Afghanistan, a largely unrecognized unitary Deobandi–Islamic theocratic emirate administered by shura councils. On October 7, 2001, four weeks after the September 11 attacks by al-Qaeda, the United States invaded Afghanistan and began bombing al-Qaeda and Taliban targets. Under the Taliban regime, al-Qaeda had used Afghanistan to train and indoctrinate fighters at its own training camps, import weapons, coordinate with other jihadists, and plot terrorist actions. 10,000 to 20,000 men passed through al-Qaeda run camps before 9/11, most of whom went to fight for the Taliban, while a smaller number were inducted into al-Qaeda. Although none of the hijackers were of Afghan nationality, the attacks had been planned in Kandahar. George W. Bush said that the goal was to capture al-Qaeda leader Osama bin Laden and bring him to justice.

On October 11, four days after the bombing started, Bush claimed that it might stop if bin Laden were handed over to the U.S. by the Taliban, which had provided safe haven to al-Qaeda. "If you cough him up and his people today, then we'll reconsider what we are doing to your country," Bush told the Taliban. "You still have a second chance. Just bring him in, and bring his leaders and lieutenants and other thugs and criminals with him." On October 14, Bush turned down an offer from the Taliban to discuss sending bin Laden to a third country. Taliban leader Mullah Omar had previously refused to extradite bin Laden. The United Kingdom was a key ally of the United States, offering support for military action from the start of preparations for the invasion, and the two countries worked with anti-Taliban Afghan forces in the Northern Alliance. The US aimed to destroy al-Qaeda and remove the Taliban regime from power, but also sought to prevent the Northern Alliance from taking control of Afghanistan, believing the Alliance's rule would alienate the country's Pashtun majority. CIA director George Tenet argued that the US should target al-Qaeda but "hold off on the Taliban," since the Taliban were popular in Pakistan and attacking them could jeopardize relations with Pakistan. By the end of October, a further goal had emerged: to remove the Taliban from power in Afghanistan.

From December 6–17, 2001, a team of Northern Alliance fighters, under direction from a U.S. special forces team, pursued bin Laden in the cave complex of Tora Bora in eastern Afghanistan, but the U.S. did not commit its own troops to the operation and bin Laden escaped to neighbouring Pakistan. That same month, the Taliban Islamic Emirate of Afghanistan fell and was replaced by the Afghan Interim Administration and then the Transitional Islamic State of Afghanistan in 2002, and finally the Islamic Republic of Afghanistan in 2004. Bin Laden was killed by a team of United States Navy SEALs in a raid on his clandestine residence in Abbottabad, Pakistan, in May 2011, nearly ten years after the initial invasion. Despite bin Laden's death, the U.S. remained in Afghanistan, propping up the governments of Hamid Karzai and Ashraf Ghani. President Donald Trump struck an arrangement with the Taliban in February 2020 that would see U.S. troops withdraw from Afghanistan. In April 2021, his successor, Joe Biden announced that a full withdrawal would occur in August of that year. This was followed by the return of the Taliban to power.

==== 2002: Venezuela ====
President Chávez asserted numerous times that United States government officials knew about plans for a coup, approved of them, and assumed they would be successful, alleging that "two military officers from the United States" were present in the headquarters of coup plotters. Rear Admiral Carlos Molina, a central leader of the coup, later said: "We felt we were acting with US support ... we agree that we can't permit a communist government here. The US has not let us down yet." The United States repeatedly informed the Venezuelan opposition that they would not be supported if there were a coup, and following the coup attempt President Bush denied any US involvement.

On 27 April 2002, chairman Cass Ballenger and Congressman Bill Delahunt of the United States met with Venezuelan media heads of Venevisión, Globovisión, Unión Radio, El Nacional, Últimas Noticias, and El Mundo, telling them that "the U.S. was opposed to any disruption of constitutional government and would condemn any coup, open or disguised, aimed at ousting Chávez". At a meeting soon after the coup between Ambassador Shapiro and then Venezuelan Vice President José Vicente Rangel at the Vice President's home, Rangel also stated to Shapiro that "no one in the upper echelons of the Venezuelan government really believed that the United States was involved in the attempted overthrow" and that if the Venezuelan government did believe so, "the two men wouldn't have been sitting in Rangel's house". Unlike much of Latin America, the US refused to condemn the coup, changing its position only after Carmona resigned.

Unnamed Organisation of American States officials and other diplomatic sources told The Observer that the coup was "tied to senior officials in the US government" and that the US was not only aware of the coup, but also gave sanction to its organizers. The paper named Elliott Abrams, who had been convicted of deceiving Congress during the Iran Contra Affair, as having greenlit the coup. Bush administration officials acknowledged meeting with some opposition leaders in the several weeks prior to 11 April but have strongly denied encouraging the coup itself, saying that they insisted on constitutional means. The purpose of the meetings was not clarified, and it is not known why US officials and the Venezuelan opposition broached the subject of a coup months before the attempted ousting took place. The New York Times quotes an anonymous Defense Department official in charge of developing policy towards Venezuela as saying: "We were not discouraging people. ... We were sending informal, subtle signals that we don't like this guy. We didn't say, 'No, don't you dare'", though he denied the Defense Department offered material help, such as weaponry.

An investigation conducted by the US inspector general, requested by US Senator Christopher Dodd, reviewed American activities leading up to and during the coup attempt. The OIG report found no "wrongdoing" by US officials either in the State Department or in the embassy, and concluded: "While it is clear that NED's, DOD's, and other U.S. assistance programs provided training, institution building, and other support to organizations and individuals understood to be actively involved in the events of April 11–14, we found no evidence that this support directly contributed, or was intended to contribute, to those events. NED is, however, mindful of the fact that, in some circumstances, its efforts to assist specific organizations, or foster open elections, could be perceived as partisan."

==== 2003–2021: Iraq ====
In 1998 as a non-covert measure, the U.S. enacted the "Iraq Liberation Act", which states, in part, that "It should be the policy of the United States to support efforts to remove the regime headed by Saddam Hussein from power in Iraq," and appropriated funds for U.S. aid "to the Iraqi democratic opposition organizations." After Bush was elected he started being more aggressive toward Iraq. After the 9/11 attacks the Bush administration claimed that Iraq's ruler at the time, Saddam Hussein, had connections to Al-Qaeda and was supporting terrorism. The administration also stated that Hussein was covertly continuing production of weapons of mass destruction despite the fact that evidence for both was not conclusive. Iraq was also one of the three countries Bush called out in his Axis of Evil Speech. In 2002 Congress passed the "Iraq Resolution" which authorized the president to "use any means necessary" against Iraq. The Iraq War then began in March 2003 when a United States-led military coalition invaded the country and overthrew the Iraqi government. The U.S. captured and helped prosecute Hussein, who was later hanged. The U.S. and the new Iraqi government also fought an insurgency following the invasion. In December 2011 the U.S. withdrew its soldiers from the conflict, but returned in 2014 to help stop the rise of the Islamic State of Iraq and the Levant (ISIL). The military's combat mission came to an end on December 9, 2021.

==== 2003: Somalia ====
With the start of the Somali Civil War, a movement known as the Islamic Courts Union emerged in Mogadishu with the aim of asserting a stable governance against the rule of Somali warlords and the anarchy that came with the overthrow of Siad Barre. The Islamic Courts Union's governance was based on providing stability through the implementation of Sharia. Despite the Islamic Courts Union often being called jihadist, the ICU did not implement very rigid interpretations of Sharia or prohibit women's employment, with Ted Dagne, an Africa Research Specialist for the Congressional Research Service, remarking that "the leadership [of the ICU] was often referred to as jihadist, extremist, and at times terrorist by some observers without much evidence to support the allegations. For example, the assessment of the Islamic Courts by U.S. officials was that less than 5% of the Islamic Courts leadership can be considered extremist, according to a senior State Department official."

Despite this, the ascendance of an Islamist political force in Somalia during this period was perceived as a threat to Western strategic interests in the Horn of Africa. Within the framework of the war on terror, the U.S. government also perceived the rise of an Islamic movement in Somalia as a potential terror risk. From 2003 onwards, the Central Intelligence Agency (CIA) initiated covert operations against the Islamic Courts Union, aiming to depose them from power. The Bush administration had become increasingly concerned with the growing power of the Islamic Courts Union, and feared that they would make Somalia a haven for Al-Qaeda to plan attacks from, like in Afghanistan. American support for the warlords extended to the point where, on numerous occasions, Nairobi-based CIA officers landed on warlord-controlled airstrips in Mogadishu with large amounts of money for distribution to Somali militias. According to John Prendergast, CIA-operated flights into Somalia had been bringing in $100,000 to US$150,000 per month for the warlords and he further claimed that the flights remained in Somalia for the day so that CIA agents can confer with them. Many of the warlords the Americans funded to fight the Islamic Courts Union had fought directly against the Americans in Mogadishu during UNOSOM II in 1993.

American efforts began with a wave of assassinations, resulting in claims by the ICU that America was funding warlords to depose their rule. According to C. Barnes & H. Hassan, "It was in this context that a military force known as Al-Shabaab (‘the Youth’) emerged, related to but seemingly autonomous of the broad based Courts movement." With CIA support, the warlords in 2006 formed the Alliance for the Restoration of Peace and Counter-Terrorism and attempted to overthrow the ICU with American backing. However, American efforts to overthrow the Islamic Courts Union in 2006 failed, as the ICU defeated the warlords America supported against them in the Second Battle of Mogadishu. American efforts to counter the ICU would not end here, however, as America would continue to support the overthrow of the ICU by supporting an Ethiopian invasion of the country. Leaked documents in 2006 revealed a confidential meeting between senior American and Ethiopian officials in Addis Ababa six months prior to the full scale December 2006 invasion. Participants deliberated on various scenarios, with the "worst-case scenario" being the potential takeover of Somalia by the Islamic Courts Union. The documents revealed that the US found the prospect unacceptable and would back Ethiopia in the event of an ICU takeover. Journalist Jon Snow reported that during the meeting "the blueprint for a very American supported Ethiopian invasion of Somalia was hatched".

Pentagon officials and intelligence analysts reported that the invasion had been planned during the summer of 2006 and that US special forces were on the ground before the Ethiopians had invaded. America participated in the invasion of Somalia, as the Bush Administration covertly deployed US Special Forces backed by AC-130 gunships in support of ENDF forces. The lightly armed court forces were unable to counter ENDF/US air supremacy and armor. The timing and scale of the attack surprised many international observers, leading many to conclude that it was 'fairly obvious that Ethiopia had received significant help' during the invasion. Reuters reported American and British Special Forces, along with US-hired mercenaries, had been laying the ground work for the invasion within and outside Somalia since late 2005. During the invasion the United States provided satellite surveillance of ICU forces to the ENDF, along with extensive military and logistical support extending to the provision of spare parts. The European Union was reportedly 'exceptionally unhappy' about the heavy US support for the invasion, and held back funds for the newly created AMISOM mission for several months. The US-backed Ethiopian invasion was eventually defeated by Somali insurgents; however, the ICU was overthrown and was unable to re-assert its control over Somalia and Mogadishu by the time of the Ethiopian withdrawal.

==== 2004: Haiti ====
In February 2004, the democratically elected President of Haiti Jean-Bertrand Aristide was forced to resign amid a rapidly spiraling situation with the rebel group National Revolutionary Front for the Liberation and Reconstruction of Haiti, which had laid siege to the capital Port-au-Prince in the week leading up to Aristide's resignation. It was alleged that the rebels were trained by U.S. Special Forces in the nearby Dominican Republic prior to the instabilities. It has also been alleged by multiple Haitian and French officials, as well as Aristide himself, that the coup was effectively orchestrated by France and the United States. In the aftermath of the coup, a Multinational Interim Force led by the U.S. invaded Haiti to stabilize the country under the government of the newly assumed provisional president Boniface Alexandre and prime minister Gérard Latortue.

==== 2005: Kyrgyzstan ====
In Kyrgyzstan, in response to the corruption and authoritarianism of the Askar Akayev government, which had ruled since 1990, mass protests ousted the government and free elections were held. According to The Wall Street Journal, the US government provided aid to opposition protesters via the State Department, USAID, Radio Liberty, and Freedom House by funding the only print-media outlet in the country not controlled by the government. When the state cut off electricity to the outlet, the U.S. embassy provided emergency generators. Other opposition groups and an opposition TV station received funding from the US government and US-based NGOs.

==== 2006–2007: Palestine ====
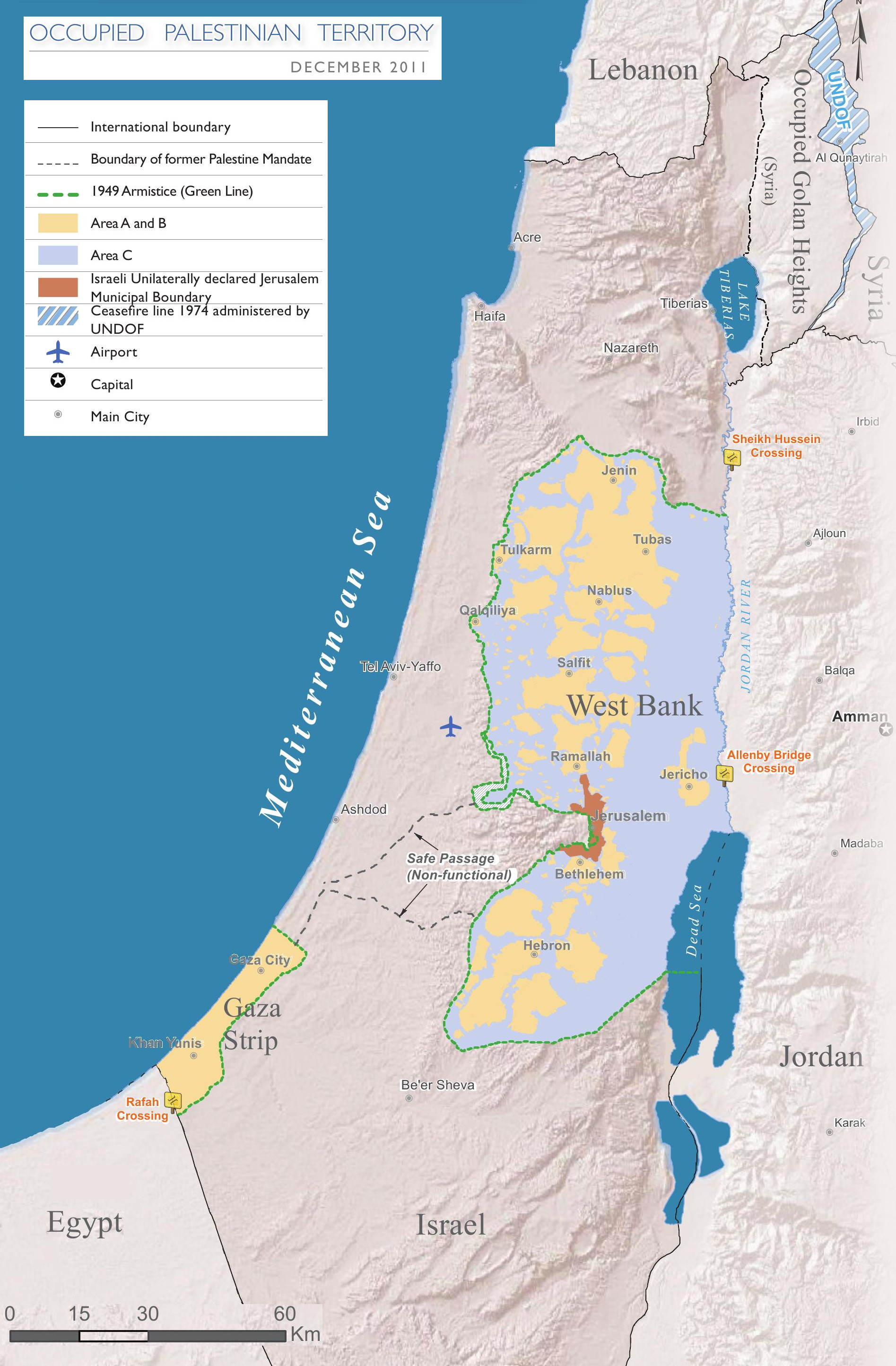
Occupied Palestinian territories

The Bush Administration was displeased with the government formed by Hamas, which won 56% of the seats in the Palestinian legislative election of 2006. The U.S. government pressured the Fatah faction of the Palestinian National Authority leadership to topple the Hamas government of Prime Minister Ismail Haniyeh, and provided funding, including a secret training and armaments program that received tens of millions of dollars in congressional funding. This funding was initially blocked by Congress, who feared that arms provided to Palestinians might later be used against Israel, but the Bush administration circumvented Congress.

Fatah launched a war against the Haniyeh government. When the government of Saudi Arabia attempted to negotiate a truce between the sides so as to avoid a wide-scale Palestinian civil war, the U.S. government pressured Fatah to reject the Saudi plan and to continue the effort to topple the Hamas government. Ultimately, the Hamas government was prevented from ruling over all of the Palestinian territories, with Fatah retreating to the West Bank and Hamas retreating to and taking control of the Gaza Strip.

==== 2005–2009: Syria ====
In 2005, after a period of co-operation in the war on terror, the Bush administration froze relations with Syria. According to US cables released by WikiLeaks, the State Department then began to funnel money to opposition groups, including at least $6 million to the opposition satellite channel Barada TV and the exile group Movement for Justice and Development in Syria, although this was denied by the channel. This alleged covert backing continued under the Obama administration until at least April 2009 when US diplomats expressed concern the funding would undermine US attempts to rebuild relations with Syrian President Bashar al-Assad.

==== 2009: Honduras ====
In 2017, The Intercept reported that military officials from the Center for Hemispheric Defense Studies had quietly assisted Honduran officers in a coup d'état against President Manuel Zelaya on 28 June 2009, helping them argue the coup's legality and arrange meetings with sympathetic U.S. lawmakers.

=== 2010s ===
==== 2010: Australia ====
Multiple leftist publications like Jacobin, World Socialist Web Site and Jordan Shanks have alleged that the ousting of Australian prime minister Kevin Rudd in the 2010 Labor leadership challenge was influenced by US involvement.

Later that year WikiLeaks leaked multiple classified cables from the US State Department which revealed that several key members of the Labor Right that were responsible for the removal of Rudd and installation of deputy prime minister and Labor Right member Julia Gillard as Labor leader and new prime minister were "protected sources" and in regular exchange with the US embassy in Canberra. Mark Arbib, who has been considered kingmaker in the "Gillard coup", has reportedly been secretly briefing the US embassy about the state of Rudd's government and possible leadership challenges to Rudd.

==== 2011: Libya ====

In 2011, Libya had been led by Muammar Gaddafi since 1969. In February 2011, amid the "Arab Spring", a revolution broke out against him, spreading from the second city Benghazi (where an interim government was set up on February 27), to the capital Tripoli, sparking the First Libyan Civil War. On March 17, United Nations Security Council Resolution 1973 was adopted, authorizing a no-fly zone over Libya, and "all necessary measures" to protect civilians. Two days later, France, the United States and the United Kingdom launched the 2011 military intervention in Libya with Operation Odyssey Dawn, US and British naval forces firing over 110 Tomahawk cruise missiles, the French and British Air Forces undertaking sorties across Libya and a naval blockade by Coalition forces. A coalition of 27 states from Europe and the Middle East soon joined the NATO-led intervention, as Operation Unified Protector. The Gaddafi government collapsed in August, leaving the National Transitional Council as the de facto government, with UN recognition. Gaddafi was captured and killed in October by National Transitional Council forces and NATO action ceased.

==== 2011–2017: Syria ====

In April 2011, after the outbreak of the Syrian civil war in early 2011, three U.S. Senators, Republicans John McCain and Lindsey Graham and Independent Joe Lieberman, urged President Barack Obama in a joint statement to "state unequivocally" that "it is time to go" for President Bashar al-Assad. In August 2011, the U.S. government called on Assad to "step aside" and imposed an oil embargo against the Syrian government. Starting in 2013, the U.S. provided training, weapons, and money to vetted moderate Syrian rebels, and in 2014, the Supreme Military Council. In 2015, Obama reaffirmed that "Assad must go".

In March 2017, Ambassador Nikki Haley told a group of reporters that the US's priority in Syria was no longer on "getting Assad out." Earlier that day at a news conference in Ankara, Secretary of State Rex Tillerson also said that the "longer term status of President Assad will be decided by the Syrian people." While the US Defense Department's program to aid predominantly Kurdish rebels fighting the Islamic State of Iraq and the Levant (ISIL) continued, it was revealed in July 2017 that US President Donald Trump had ordered a "phasing out" of the CIA's support for anti-Assad rebels. Ultimately, the Assad regime fell in the 2024 Syrian opposition offensives spearheaded by Hay'at Tahrir al-Sham (HTS), the Syrian National Army (SNA), and the Southern Operations Room (SOR).

==== 2019: Bolivia ====
In November 2019, Bolivian president Evo Morales resigned in what he and some US lawmakers called a coup; Morales then went into exile in Argentina. Morales claimed the following month that the U.S. had plotted to oust him for choosing to seek lithium extraction partnerships with Russia and China. In the aftermath, following the elections which brought back the socialist Movimiento al Socialismo to power, the coup narrative was proven false, but the U.S. still faced allegations that it had supported Morales' removal, including Justice Department pressure against MIT researchers whose work argued that Morales' reelection for a fourth term was legitimate.

=== 2020s ===
==== 2025–2026: Greenland ====
As president in 2025, Trump renewed annexation threats against Greenland and refused to rule out military force. After the military intervention removing Maduro from office in 2026, Trump again threatened military action "whether they like it or not". The United States in 2025 had also set up influencers and intelligence agencies to spy in Greenland and perform "covert influence operations", resulting in two US ambassador summons by Denmark.

==== 2025–2026: Venezuela ====

After Trump was reelected in the 2024 United States presidential election, he took on a harsher stance regarding Venezuela and began preparing an intervention against Nicolás Maduro's government, accusing it of having ties with narco-terrorist networks such as the Tren de Aragua and taking part in drug-trafficking, although evidence for such claims was inconclusive. During the 2025 United States naval deployment in the Caribbean, Trump stated in October that he had authorized the CIA to conduct covert operations in Venezuela, which Maduro denounced. On 3 January 2026, the United States conducted airstrikes on multiple locations across Venezuela, including the capital city of Caracas, and captured and exfiltrated Venezuelan President Maduro. President Donald Trump announced that Maduro had been captured alongside his wife Cilia Flores and flown out of the country. Attorney General Pam Bondi said both would face charges of narcoterrorism in the United States. The government formerly led by Maduro remained in place, and Venezuela's Supreme Tribunal of Justice ordered Vice President Delcy Rodríguez to assume the presidency. In just a few months, Rodríguez reshuffled roughly 40% of her cabinet, replacing 17 ministers and updating military leadership to install her own loyalists. Powerful Maduro loyalists, such as long-serving Defense Minister Vladimir Padrino López and Attorney General Tarek William Saab, were stripped of their posts. This consolidation was further highlighted when Venezuela’s Minister of Industry and National Production, Alex Saab, was also captured in February 2026 in a joint operation by American and Venezuelan intelligence agencies. In May 2026, he was deported to the US. Various analysts have called the US action "regime change."

==== 2026: Cuba ====
During its intervention in Venezuela, the US caused an oil shortage in Cuba with the aim to remove the current government by the end of the year.

==== 2026: Iran ====
In February 2026, the United States, alongside Israel, launched a major attack on Iran with the stated goal of regime change. On 28 February 2026, Iranian supreme leader Ali Khamenei was killed in an Israeli missile strike.

== See also ==
- American imperialism
- Assassinations and targeted killing by the CIA
- CIA activities by country
- Criticism of United States foreign policy
- Foreign electoral intervention
- Foreign interventions by the United States
- Latin America–United States relations
- List of United States invasions of Latin American countries
- Russian involvement in regime change
- Soviet involvement in regime change
- Timeline of United States military operations
- United States involvement in regime change in Latin America
- United States and state terrorism
- United States and state-sponsored terrorism
- American expansionism under Donald Trump

== Bibliography ==
- Bass, Gary J. (2008). Freedom's Battle: The Origins of Humanitarian Intervention. Knopf Doubleday. ISBN 978-0-307-26929-4.
- Becker, Marc (2022). Contemporary Latin American Revolutions. Rowman & Littlefield. ISBN 9781538163740.
- Bert, Wayne (2016). American Military Intervention in Unconventional War: From the Philippines to Iraq. Springer. ISBN 978-0-230-33781-7.
- Bevins, Vincent (2020). The Jakarta Method: Washington's Anticommunist Crusade and the Mass Murder Program that Shaped Our World. PublicAffairs. ISBN 978-1541742406.
- Blakeley, Ruth (2009). State Terrorism and Neoliberalism: The North in the South. Routledge. ISBN 978-0-415-68617-4.
- Blum, William (2003). Killing Hope: US Military and CIA Interventions Since World War II. Zed Books. ISBN 978-1-84277-369-7.
- Bruzzese, Anthony (2008). The Origins of Intervention: America, Italy, and the Fight Against Communism, 1947–1953. ISBN 978-0-494-46952-1.
- Coll, Steve (2004). Ghost Wars: The Secret History of the CIA, Afghanistan, and Bin Laden, from the Soviet Invasion to September 10, 2001. Penguin Group. ISBN 9781594200076.
- Cooley, Alexander (2012). Great Games, Local Rules: The New Power Contest in Central Asia. Oxford University Press. ISBN 978-0-19-981200-4.
- Cullinane, Michael (2012). Liberty and American Anti-Imperialism: 1898–1909. Springer. ISBN 978-1-137-00257-0.
- Demarais, Agathe (2022). Backfire: How Sanctions Reshape the World Against U.S. Interests. Columbia University Press. p. 31. ISBN 9780231199902.
- Foner, Philip (1972). The Spanish–Cuban–American War and the Birth of American Imperialism Vol. 1: 1895–1898. NYU Press. ISBN 978-0-85345-266-9.
- Foner, Philip (1972). The Spanish–Cuban–American War and the Birth of American Imperialism Vol. 2: 1898–1902. NYU Press. ISBN 978-0-85345-267-6.
- Fouskas, Vassilis; Gökay, Bülent (2005). The New American Imperialism: Bush's War on Terror and Blood for Oil. Greenwood Publishing Group. ISBN 978-0-275-98476-2.
- Grow, Michael (2008). U.S. Presidents and Latin American Interventions: Pursuing Regime Change in the Cold War. University Press of Kansas. ISBN 978-0-7006-1586-5.
- Harland, Michael (2013). Democratic Vanguardism: Modernity, Intervention, and the Making of the Bush Doctrine. Lexington Books. ISBN 978-0-7391-7970-3.
- Hiro, Dilip (2014). War Without End: The Rise of Islamist Terrorism and Global Response. Routledge. ISBN 978-1-136-48556-5.
- Hoskyns, Catherine (1965). The Congo Since Independence: January 1960 – December 1961. London: Oxford University Press. OCLC 414961.
- Jervis, Robert; Labrosse, Diane N.; Goddard, Stacie E.; Rovner, Joshua (2023). Chaos reconsidered: the liberal order and the future of international politics. New York: Columbia University Press. doi:10.7312/ali-20448-027. ISBN 9780231205993.
- Kinzer, Stephen (2006). Overthrow: America's Century of Regime Change from Hawaii to Iraq. Times Books. ISBN 978-0-8050-8240-1.
- LaFontaine, J.S. (1986). City Politics: A Study of Léopoldville 1962–63. American Studies. Cambridge University Press Archive.
- Little, Douglas (2009). American Orientalism: The United States and the Middle East since 1945. University of North Carolina Press. ISBN 978-0-8078-7761-6.
- Little, Douglas (2016). Us versus Them: The United States, Radical Islam, and the Rise of the Green Threat. UNC Press Books. ISBN 978-1-4696-2681-9.
- Martell, Peter (2018). First Raise a Flag. London: Hurst & Company. ISBN 978-1849049597.
- Maurer, Noel (2013). The Empire Trap: The Rise and Fall of U.S. Intervention to Protect American Property Overseas, 1893–2013. Princeton University Press. ISBN 978-1-4008-4660-3.
- McPherson, Alan (2016). A Short History of U.S. Interventions in Latin America and the Caribbean. John Wiley & Sons. ISBN 978-1-118-95400-3.
- McPherson, Alan (2013). Encyclopedia of U.S. Military Interventions in Latin America. ABC-CLIO. ISBN 978-1-59884-260-9.
- Moulton, Aaron Coy (July 2013). ""Amplies Ayuda Externa" Contra "La Gangrena Comunista": Las Fuerzas Regionales Anticomunistas y la Finalizacion de la Operacion PBFortune, Octobre de 1952" ["Extend External Assistance" Against "The Communist Gangrene": The Regional Anti-Communist Forces and the Finalization of Operation PBFortune, October 1952]. Revista de Historia de América (in Spanish) (149): 45–58. doi:10.35424/rha.149.2013.406. JSTOR 44732841. S2CID 257442076.
- Neuman, William (2022). Things Are Never So Bad That They Can't Get Worse: Inside the Collapse of Venezuela (1st ed.). St. Martin's Press. ISBN 978-1250266163.
- North, David (2016). A Quarter Century of War. Mehring Books. ISBN 978-1-893638-69-3.
- Nugent, Paul (2004). Africa since Independence: A Comparative History. New York: Palgrave-MacMillan. ISBN 9780333682739.
- Parmar, Inderjeet; Cox, Michael (2010). Soft Power and US Foreign Policy: Theoretical, Historical and Contemporary Perspectives. Routledge. ISBN 978-1-135-15048-8.
- Sandstrom, Karl (July 18, 2013). Local Interests and American Foreign Policy: Why International Interventions Fail. Routledge. ISBN 978-1-135-04165-6.
- Schoonover, Thomas (2013). Uncle Sam's War of 1898 and the Origins of Globalization. University Press of Kentucky. ISBN 978-0-8131-4336-1.
- Sullivan, Michael (2008). American adventurism abroad: invasions, interventions, and regime changes since World War II. Blackwell Publishers. ISBN 978-1-4051-7075-8.
- *Traugott, M. (1979). The Economic Origins of the Kwilu Rebellion. Comparative Studies in Society and History, 21(3), 459–479. Retrieved from The Economic Origins of the Kwilu Rebellion
- Villafana, Frank (2017) [1st pub. 2009]. Cold War in the Congo: The Confrontation of Cuban Military Forces, 1960-1967. Abingdon; New York City: Routledge. ISBN 978-1-4128-4766-7.
- Wilford, Hugh (2008). The Mighty Wurlitzer: How the CIA Played America. Harvard University Press. ISBN 978-0-674-04517-0.
- Wilford, Hugh (2013). America's Great Game: The CIA's Secret Arabists and the Shaping of the Modern Middle East. Basic Books. ISBN 978-0-465-01965-6.
- Woodward, Bob (2002). Bush at War. Internet Archive. New York : Simon & Schuster. ISBN 978-0-7432-0473-6.
- Wright, Donald P.; Bird, James; Clay, Steven; et al. (2010). A Different Kind of War: The United States Army in Operation Enduring Freedom (OEF) October 2001-September 2005 (PDF). Fort Leavenworth, Kansas: Combat Studies Institute Press. Archived from the original (PDF) on December 30, 2016.
