= Richard Sale (journalist) =

American journalist

Richard T. Sale (born 1939) is a journalist and novelist, best known for his report The Blackstone Rangers (1971). He is currently the Intelligence Correspondent for the Middle East Times.

== Career ==
Sale has worked for The Washington Post and The San Francisco Examiner. He has most recently worked for UPI as a special correspondent for five years.

== Awards and honors ==
Sale has won a number of awards and was a Pulitzer Prize finalist.

== Publications ==
The Blackstone Rangers is a book-length investigative report on the Black P. Stone Rangers. Sale is also the author of Traitors: The Worst Acts of Treason in American History from Benedict Arnold to Robert Hanssen (2003) and Clinton’s Secret Wars.

== Personal ==
Richard Sale lived in Durham, North Carolina.
