= Nationalization of the Iranian oil industry =

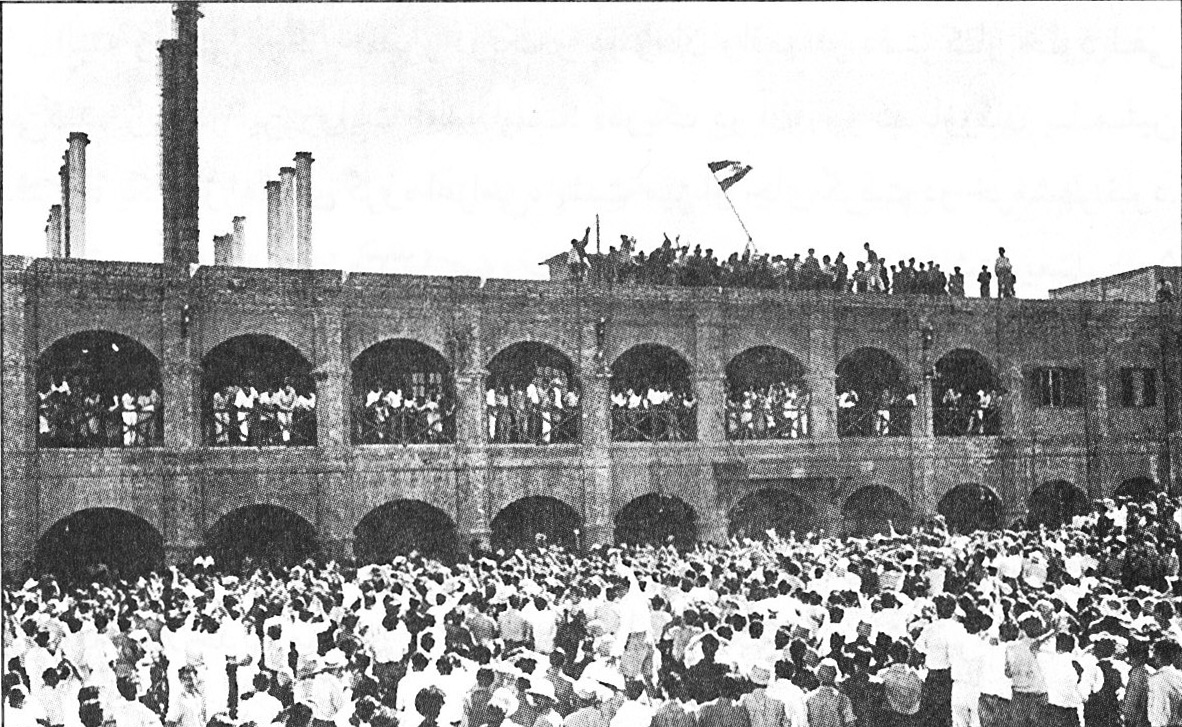
NIOC directorate enters the AIOC building in Abadan, 20 June 1951.

The nationalization of the Iranian oil industry (Persian: نهضت ملی شدن صنعت نفت ایران) resulted from a movement in the Iranian parliament (Majlis) to seize control of Iran's oil industry, which had been run by private companies, largely controlled by foreign interests. The legislation was passed on 15 March 1951, and was verified by the Majlis on 17 March 1951. The legislation led to the nationalization of the Anglo-Iranian Oil Company (AIOC) and the formation of the National Iranian Oil Company (NIOC). The movement was led by Mohammad Mosaddegh, a member of the Majlis for the National Front and future prime minister of Iran.

The movement to nationalize the oil industry was the reaction to the following concessions made by Iran to foreign powers: the 1872 Reuter concession, the 1901 D'Arcy Concession, the 1933 agreement between the Iranian government and AIOC, and the 1949 Gas-Gulshaiyan Supplemental Oil Agreement. According to the political scientist Mark J. Gasiorowski, the oil nationalization movement had two major results: the establishment of a democratic government and the pursuit of Iranian national sovereignty.

== Background ==
From the time of the discovery of oil in Iran, foreign powers used force and exploited the weakness of the Iranian state to coerce it into concessions which allowed foreign companies to control oil extraction. The nationalization of the oil industry was the response to these foreign interventions. Particularly the following concessions:

1. 1872 Reuter concession
2. 1901 D'Arcy Concession
3. 1933 Agreement between Iran and AIOC
4. 1949 Gass-Gulshaiyan Supplemental Oil Agreement

Relations between Iran and AIOC were never smooth. In 1932 Iran considered expropriation. Tensions increased during the 1940s as British taxes increased while royalties to Iran declined. By 1948, Britain received substantially more revenue from AIOC than Iran. Negotiations to meet this and other Iranian concerns exacerbated rather than eased tensions.

The competition to gain more control of the Iranian oil industry increased during World War II when the United Kingdom, the Soviet Union and the United States all became involved in Iranian affairs. When faced with demands from the oil companies of these three countries, the Iranian government announced that the issue would be decided after the war. After the war, no agreement was reached.

Gholamhosein Rahimiyan^{[full name?]}, the member from Quchan in the 14th Majlis was the first who introduced a plan to nationalize the oil industry. However, this plan was never discussed. On 23 October 1949, at home of Mohammad Mosaddegh and in the presence of twelve experts the National Front (political party) was established. It consisted of various political efforts whose joint objective was the protection of the rights of Iranian oil industry.

== Movement ==
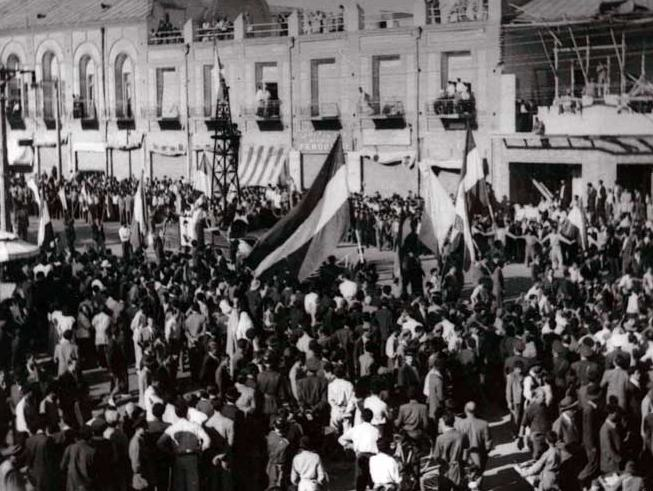
Rally following nationalization

Mohammad Mosaddegh (1882–1967) was an Iranian politician and the leader of the movement to nationalize Iran's oil industry. He was educated in Europe, and joined politics after the Iranian Constitutional Revolution of 1905–1907. He held multiple posts such as member of parliament, governor of the Fars province, finance minister, foreign minister, and prime minister. In the election of the 14th Majlis in 1943, he was elected member for Tehran. Before gaining recognition as the leader of the national oil movement, he played a large role in the Trans-Iranian Railway project and the re-organization of the courts and the Justice Department.

== Event ==
The 16th Majlis consisted of some members from National Front such as Mosaddegh. Mosaddegh had sought to audit the documents of AIOC, in order to verify that AIOC was paying the contracted royalties to Iran, and to limit the company's control over Iranian oil reserves. AIOC refused to co-operate with the Iranian government. In November 1950, the rejection of the oil supplemental agreement was offered from oil committee of Majlis which was chaired by Mosaddegh. The prime minister at the time, Haj Ali Razmara, opposed the measure. On 7 March 1951, Razmara was murdered by Khalil Tahmasebi, a member of Fada'iyan-e Islam. After the death of Razmara, the Majlis began the process of nationalizing the Iranian oil industry.

On 15 March 1951, legislation to nationalize the oil industry was passed by the Majlis with a majority of votes. On 17 March, the Majlis verified the nationalization of Iran oil industry and the AIOC was nationalized.

== Aftermath ==
In April, Mosaddegh was selected as prime minister by Shah Mohammad Reza Pahlavi under immense pressure from the Majlis.

In the aftermath of March 1951, the economic crisis worsened and Iranian oil was not bought by other countries. The Abadan Refinery, at the time one of the largest oil refineries in the world, was closed. The nationalization of the Iranian oil industry continued even through strong opposition from the United States and the United Kingdom.

In the first year of the nationalization, the only foreign sale of Iranian oil were 300 barrels to an Italian merchant ship. Foreign oil companies prevented any impacts of the Iranian withdrawal from being felt by consumer countries by increasing output elsewhere. Oil production was expanded by BP and ARAMCO in Saudi Arabia, Kuwait and Iraq. Oil production in the Middle East increased by around 10% annually in 1951, 1952 and 1953. With Iranian oil production decreasing from 242 million barrels in 1950 to 10.6 million barrels in 1952, the loss of oil exports severely impacted the economy.

On 26 May 1951, the UK took Iran to the International Court of Justice, demanding that the 1933 agreement be upheld and that Iran pay damages and compensation for disrupting the UK-incorporated company's profits.

On 22 July 1952, the ICJ decided that it had no jurisdiction in this matter (Iran's original contention).

In August 1953, the government of Mosaddegh was overthrown by a military coup d'état orchestrated by the CIA and the MI6. Mosaddegh was sentenced to three years in prison and then kept under house arrest until his death in 1967.

After the coup, the Iranian oil crisis ended and the AIOC did not succeed to stop production. The National Iranian oil company as an international consortium was founded and the AIOC was made a member. With the nationalization of the oil industry, British and American political influence continued for years after the coup.

== See also ==
- Energy in Iran
- Mohammad Ali Keshavarz Sadr
- Ministry of Petroleum of Iran
- National Iranian Oil Company
- National Iranian Oil Refining and Distribution Company
- National Iranian Petrochemical Company
- National Iranian Gas Company
- Suez Crisis
