= Emam Mosque (Tehran) =

Historic mosque in Tehran, Iran

- مسجد امام
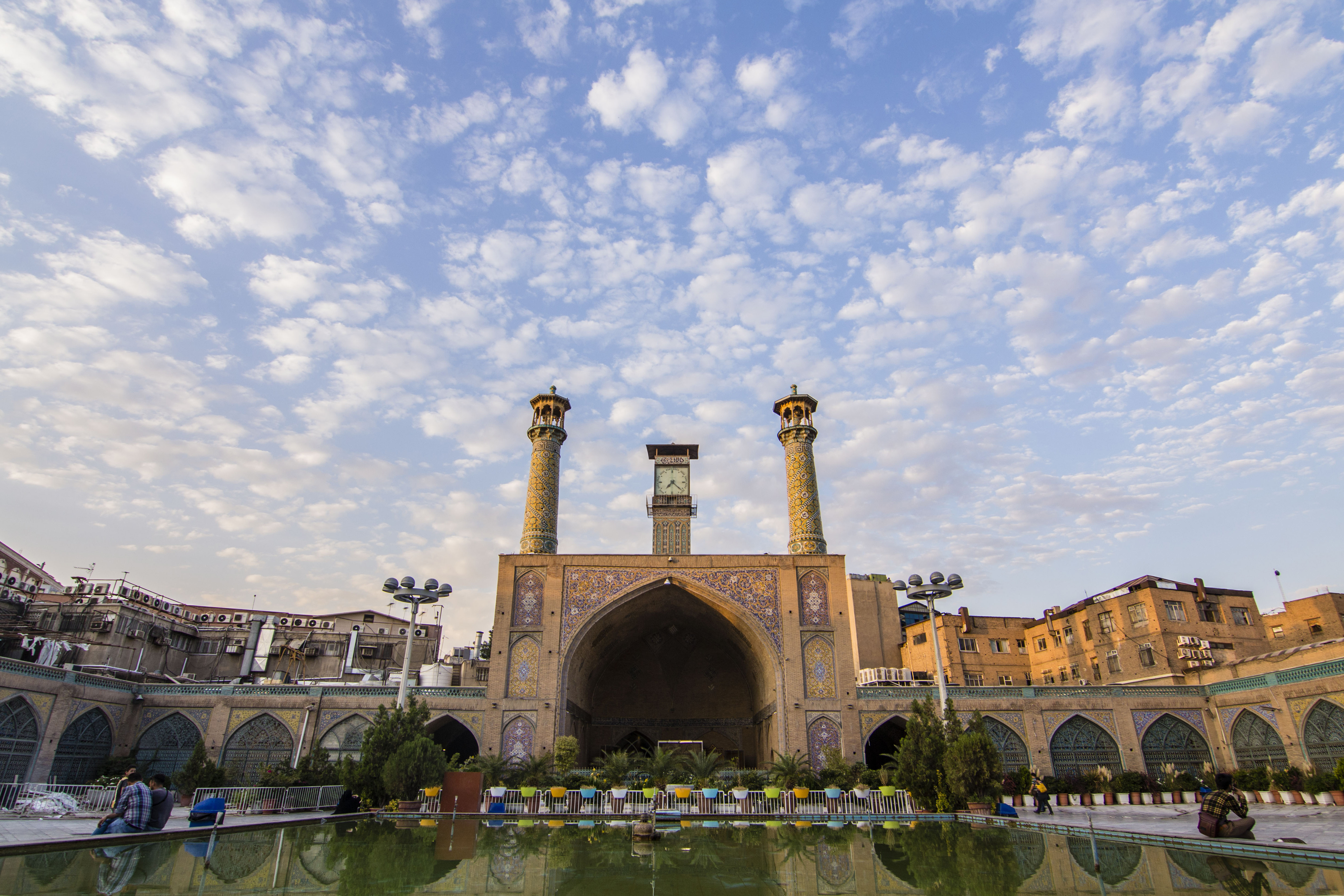
- The mosque in 2017

- Location of the mosque in Tehran

Religion
- Affiliation: Shia Islam
- Ecclesiastical or organisational status: Mosque
- Status: Active

Location
- Location: Grand Bazaar, Tehran, Tehran province
- Country: Iran
- Coordinates: 35°40′35″N 51°25′20″E

Architecture
- Architect: Ali-Akhbar Isfahani
- Type: Mosque architecture
- Style: Qajar
- Founder: Fath-Ali Shah Qajar (1825); Naser al-Din Shah Qajar (1879)
- Groundbreaking: 1810 CE
- Completed: 1825 CE; 1879 CE (minarets); 1905 CE (clock tower)

Specifications
- Dome: One (maybe more)
- Minaret: Two
- Materials: Bricks; plaster; tiles

Website
- https://masjedimam.com
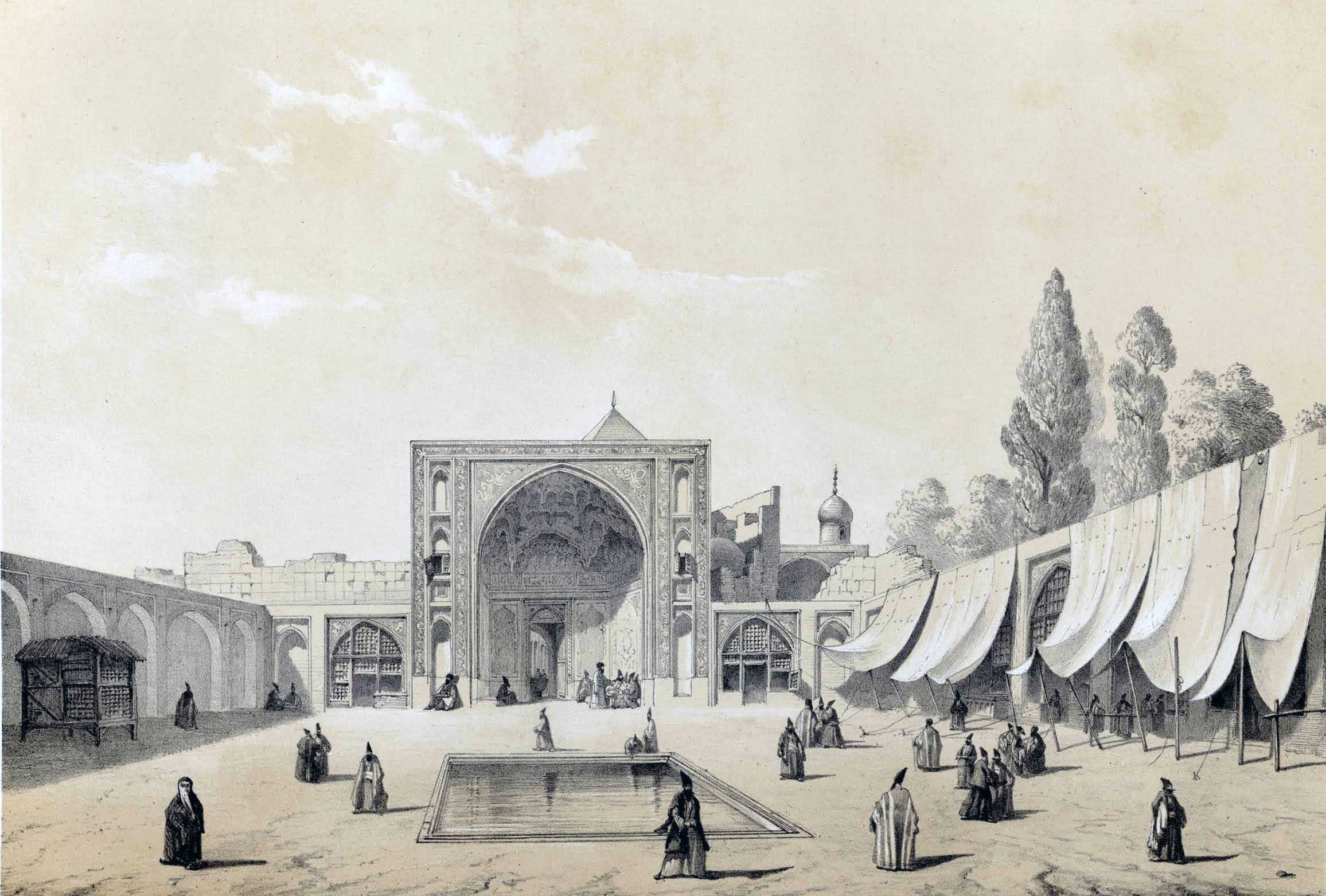
- The mosque by Eugène Flandin in 1851

Iran National Heritage List
- Official name: Imam Mosque of Tehran
- Type: Built
- Designated: 23 September 1984
- Reference no.: 1667
- Conservation organization: Cultural Heritage, Handicrafts and Tourism Organization of Iran

The Emam Mosque (Persian: مسجد امام, romanized: Masjed-e Emām), formerly known as the Soltāni Mosque (مسجد سلطانی) meaning "royal", less commonly spelled as the Imam Mosque (Persian: مسجد امام, romanized: Masjed-e Emām) (Note: Officially, the Imam Khomeini Mosque.) is a mosque in the northern section of the Grand Bazaar in Tehran, Iran.

The mosque was added to the Iran National Heritage List on 23 September 1984, administered by the Cultural Heritage, Handicrafts and Tourism Organization of Iran.

== Structure ==
The mosque was built by the order of Fath-Ali Shah Qajar, the second Shah of Qajar Iran, as one of several such symbols of legitimacy for the new Qajar dynasty. At the time of its completion, the mosque was considered to be the most significant architectural monument in Tehran. The mosque was designed by Ali-Akhbar Isfahani.

During the reign of Naser al-Din Shah Qajar, the two current minarets were added to the structure. The mosque is topped by a small gilded dome. The mosque also has two Shabestans.

The courtyard is accessed from several parts of the Grand Bazaar. There are some significant architectural similarities between the Shāh Mosque, the Vakil Mosque in Shiraz, and the Soltāni Mosque in Borujerd.

The mosque is detailed with 18 million bricks and 475,000 tiles.

== Notable events ==
On 11 December 1905, the vāli of Tehran ordered the public flogging of 17 prominent merchants of the bazaar in the main courtyard of the Shāh Mosque, blaming them for the increase in the price of sugar. The public humiliation of the merchants was condemned by the Bazaaris and in protest, the Grand Bazaar shut its doors. A public backlash against the government in a series of related incidents ignited the Persian Constitutional Revolution.

On 7 March 1951, Haj Ali Razmara, pro-British and unpopular Prime Minister of Iran, was attending the memorial service for Ayatollah Feyz at the Shāh Mosque. On his way to the mosque, he was shot dead in the mosque's grand courtyard by Khalil Tahmasebi, who was described by The New York Times as a "religious fanatic". According to the Encyclopædia Britannica, Tahmasebi was a member of the Shiite activist group "Fedaʾeyān-e Eslām (Persian: 'Self-Sacrificers of Islam'), an extremist religious organization with close ties to the traditional merchant class and the clergy." In 1952, Tahmasebi was freed and pardoned by the Iranian Parliament during the premiership of Mohammad Mosaddegh, and he was declared a Soldier of Islam. Following the 1953 Iranian coup d'état, Tahmasebi was re-arrested and tried; he was executed in 1955.

== Gallery ==
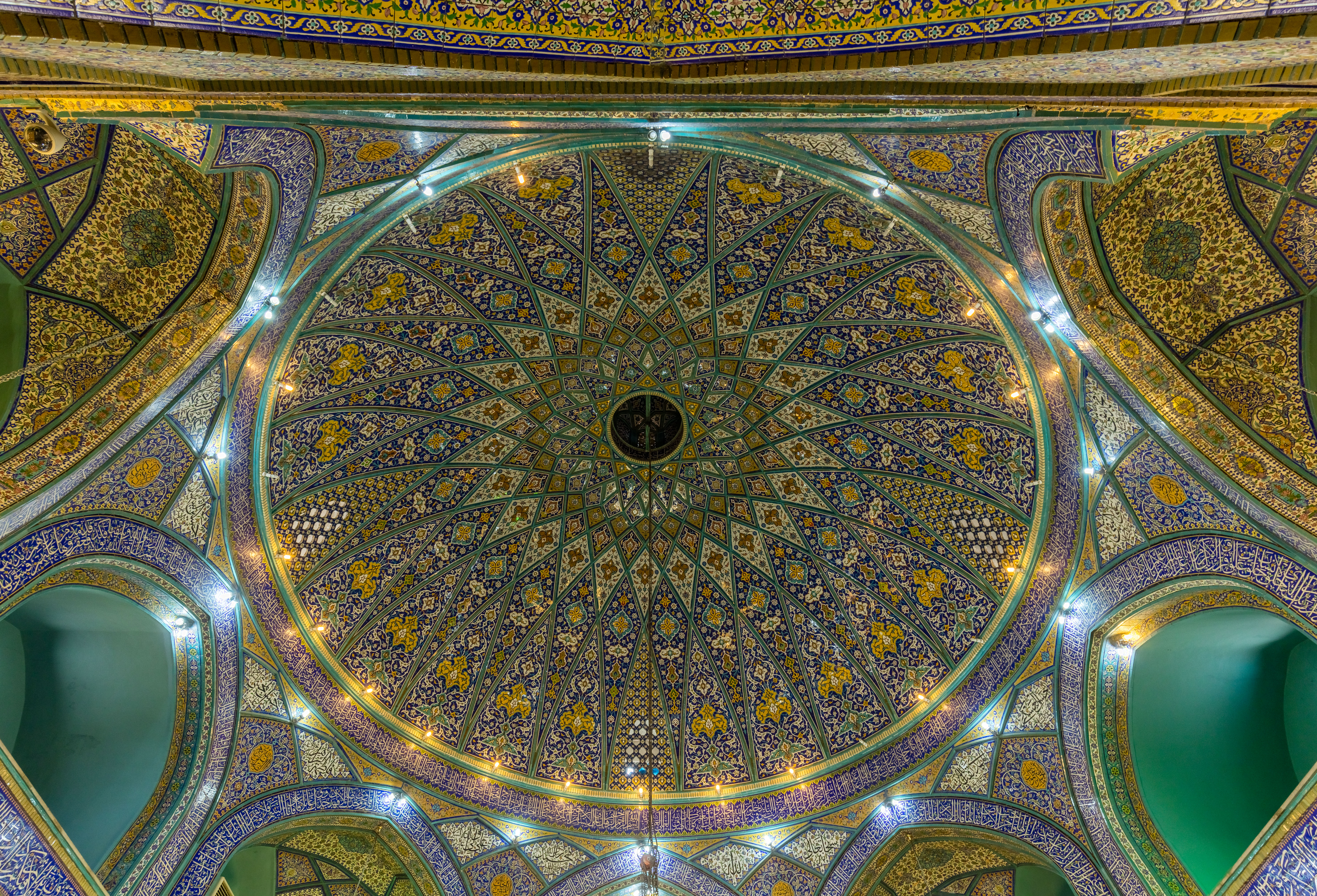
Dome interior

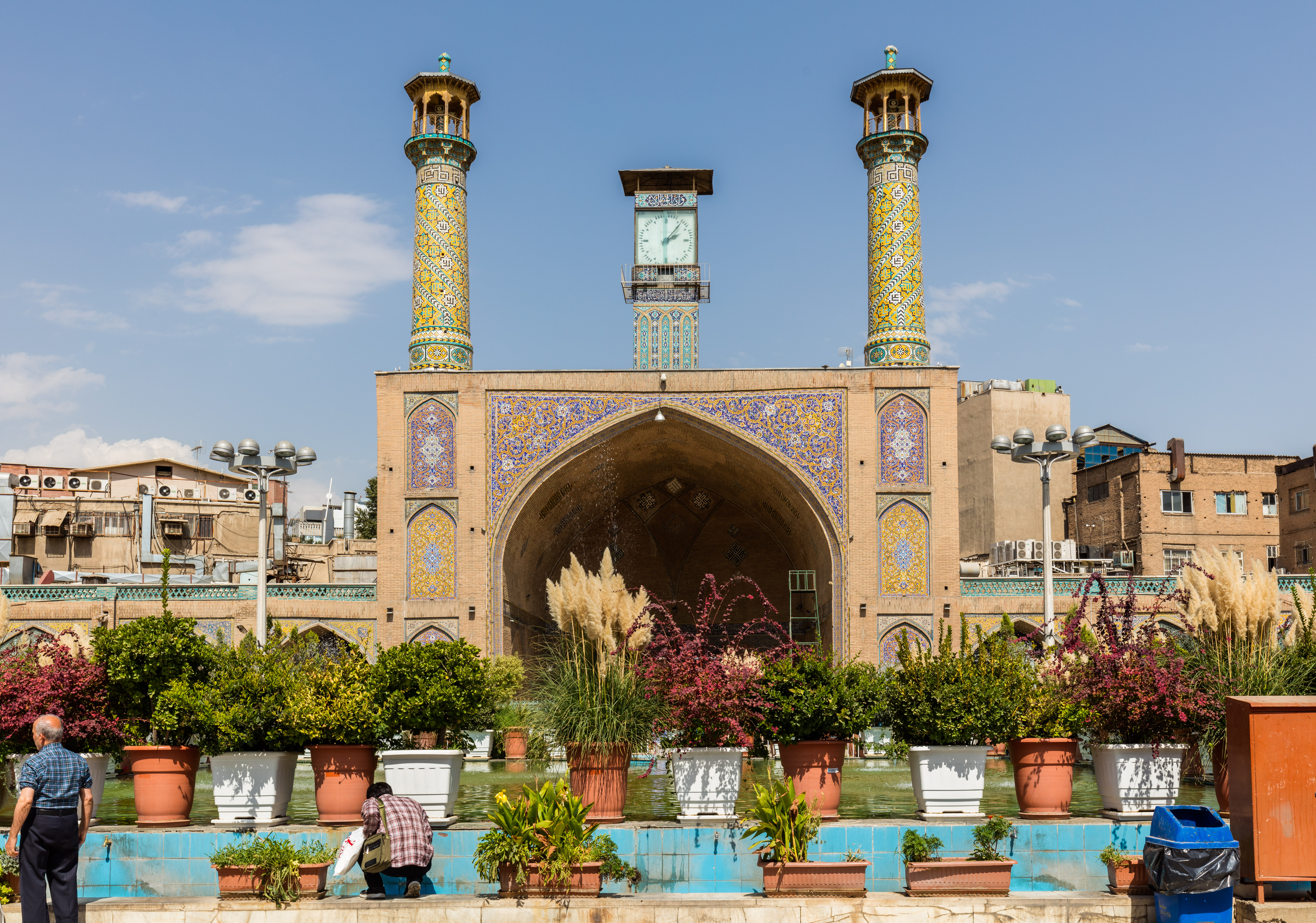
Courtyard

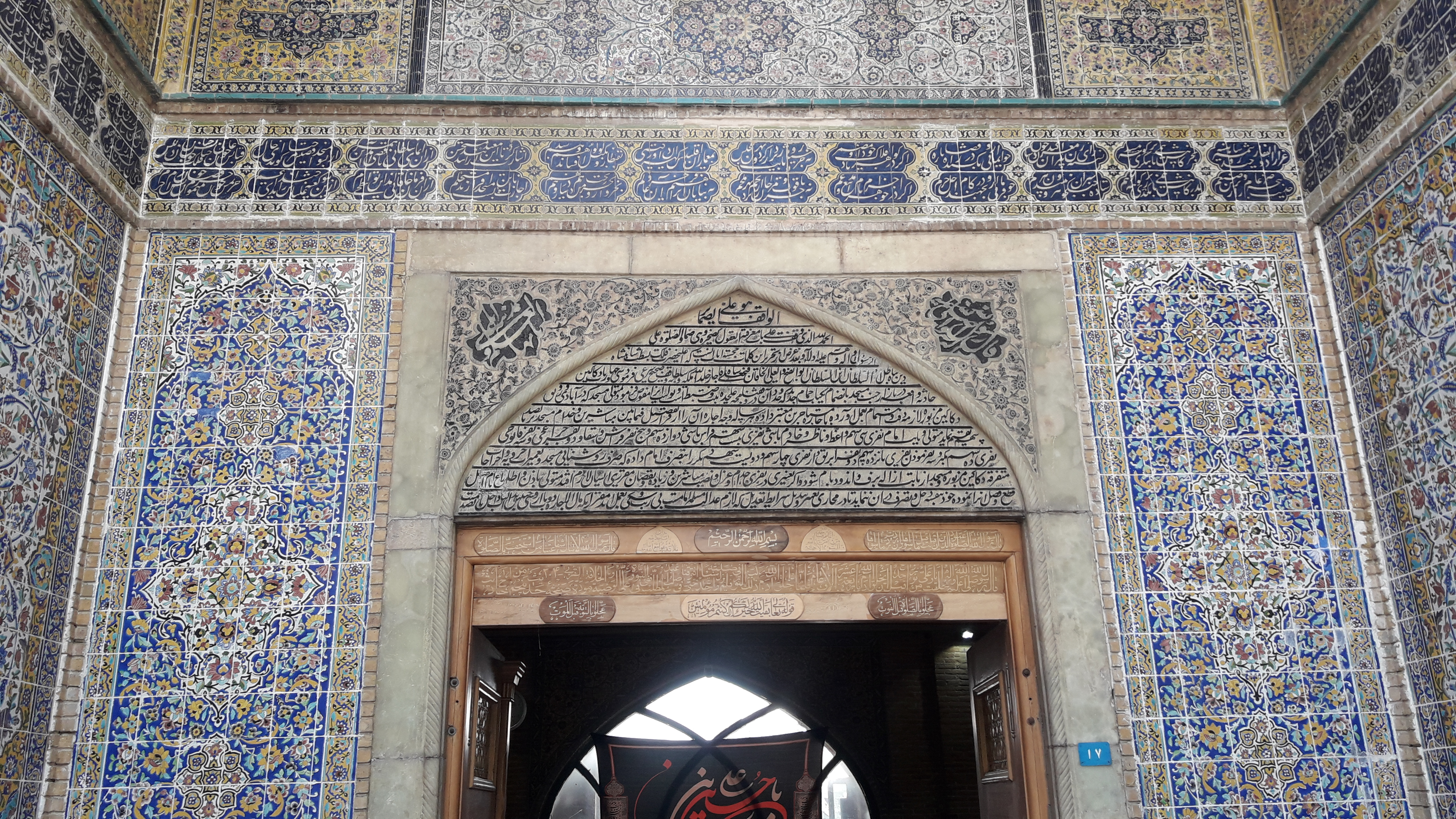
Calligraphy above a door

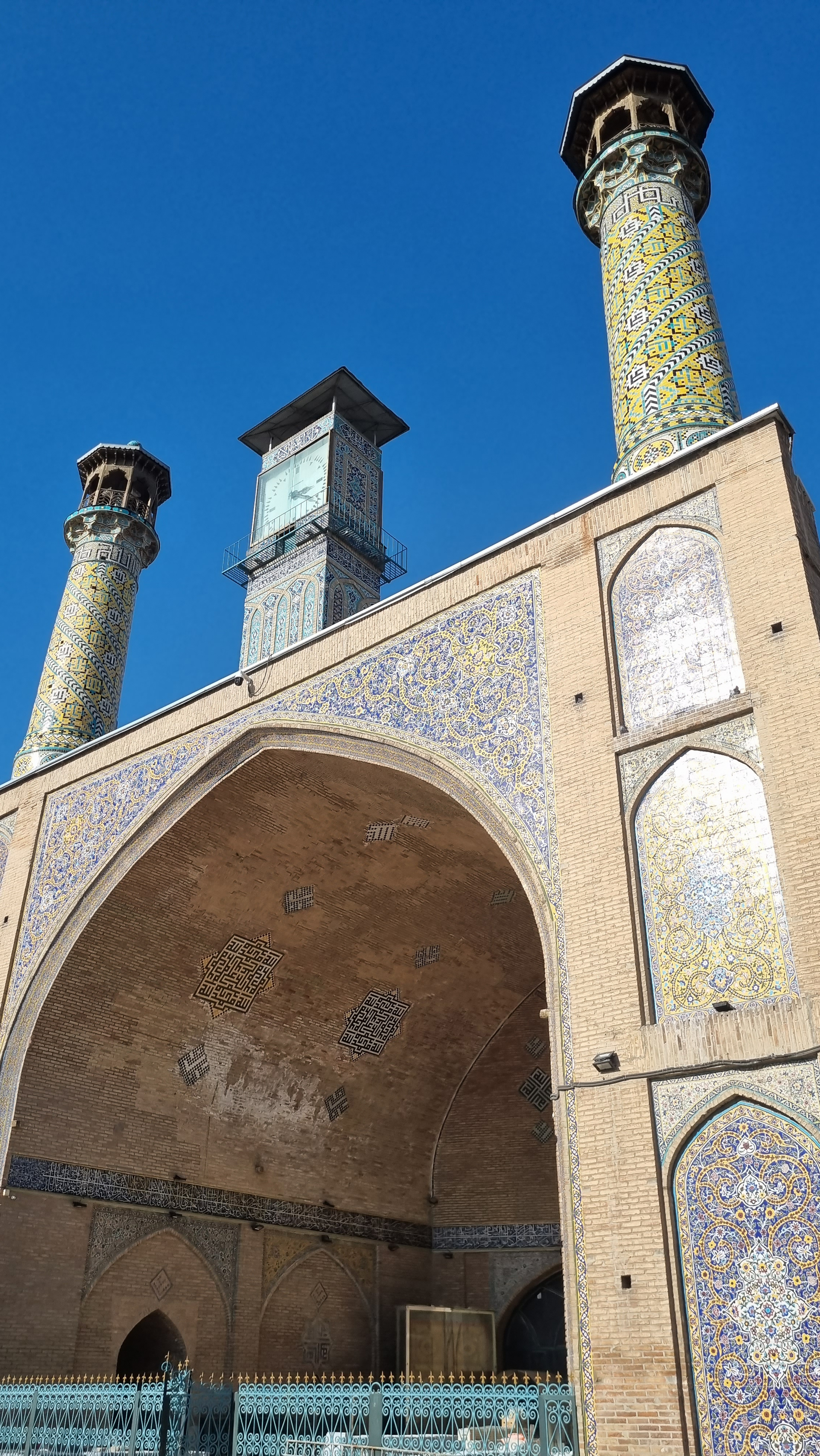
Minarets of the mosque

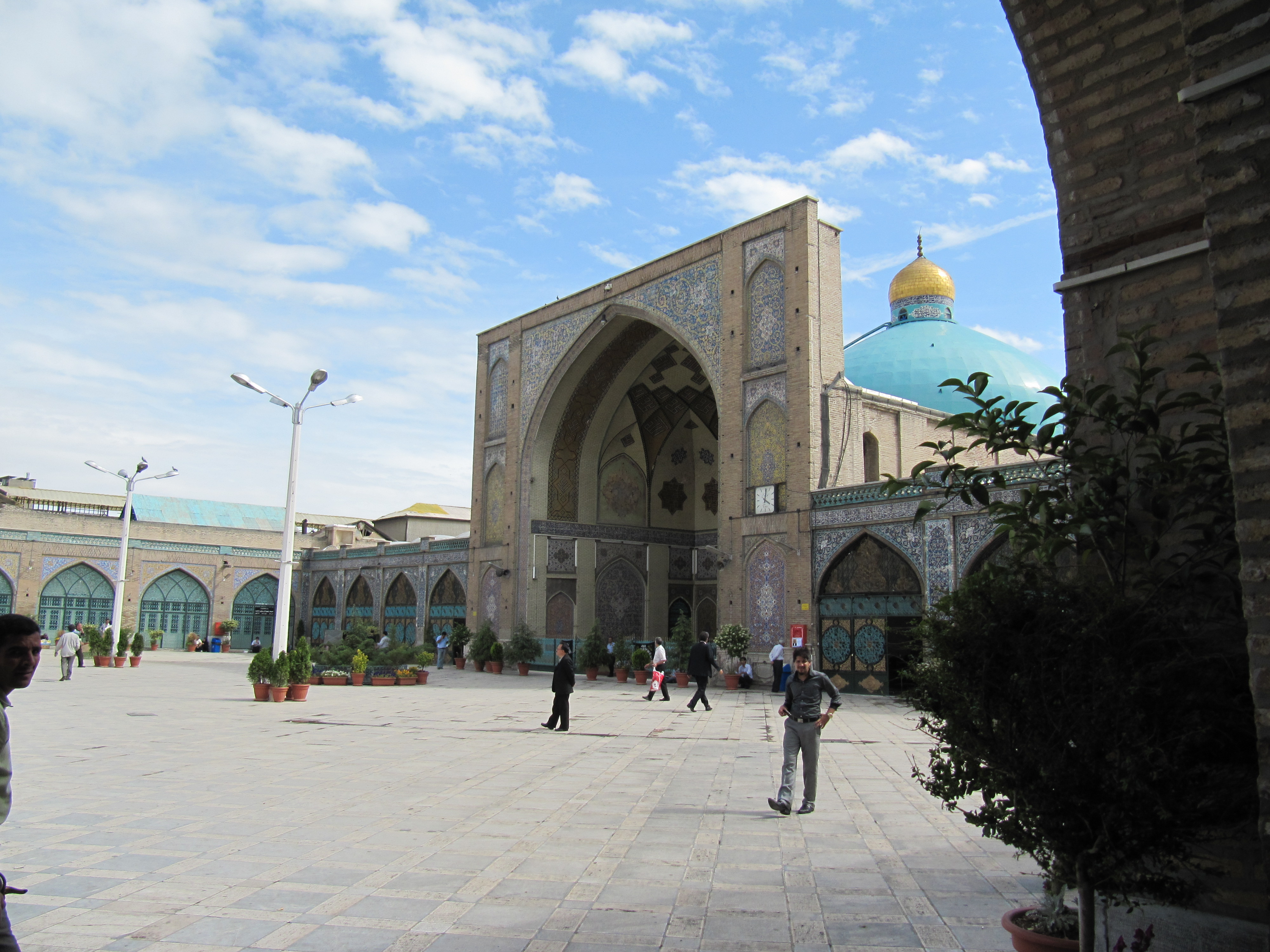
Shah Mosque, by sipo, licensed under CC BY 2.0

== See also ==
- Shia Islam in Iran
- List of mosques in Iran
