= 1953 Iranian coup d'état =

Coup to depose Prime Minister Mohammed Mosaddegh

- Part of the Abadan Crisis and the Cold War
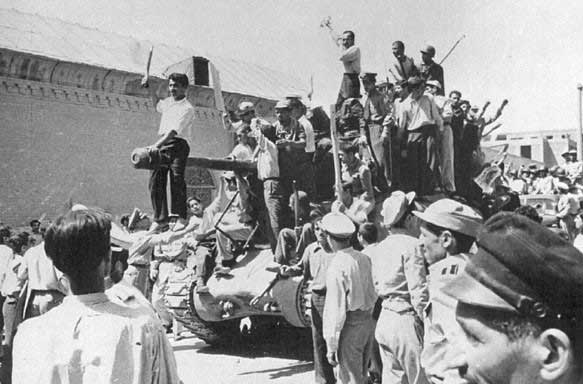
- Coup supporters celebrate victory in Tehran
Date	15–19 August 1953
Location	Tehran, Imperial State of Iran
Result	House of Pahlavi victory: Overthrow of Prime Minister Mohammad Mosaddegh; General Fazlollah Zahedi appointed as prime minister of post-coup military government by Shah Mohammad Reza Pahlavi; Monarchy increased in power relative to government; Pro-Western anti-communist dictatorship established

Belligerents
Government of Mosaddegh; National Front; Tudeh Party; Third Force	House of Pahlavi; United Kingdom (Note: Covertly); United States

Commanders and leaders
Mohammad Mosaddegh (surrendered); Gholam Hossein Sadighi (POW); Hossein Fatemi (executed); Taghi Riahi (POW); Khosro Roozbeh (executed) Khalil Maleki	Mohammad Reza Pahlavi; Fazlollah Zahedi; Nematollah Nassiri (POW); Shaban Jafari; Assadollah Rashidian; Mahmud Mir-Djalali; Winston Churchill; Anthony Eden; John Sinclair; Dwight D. Eisenhower; Allen Dulles; Kermit Roosevelt Jr.

Units involved
Pro-Mosaddegh Army factions; National Front partisans; Tudeh Military Network	Pro-Zahedi Army factions; Imperial Guard; Royalists; Shia clergy; MI6; CIA

Casualties and losses
- 200–300 killed

On 19 August 1953 a coup d'état overthrew the Prime Minister of Iran, Mohammad Mosaddegh, strengthening the rule of Mohammad Reza Pahlavi, the Shah of Iran. It was instigated by the United Kingdom (MI6), under the name Operation Boot and by the United States (CIA), under the name TP-AJAX Project or Operation Ajax. A key motive was to protect British oil interests in Iran after Mosaddegh had nationalized the country's oil industry in 1951.

Mosaddegh had sought to audit the documents of the Anglo-Iranian Oil Company (AIOC), a British corporation (subsequently part of BP), to verify that AIOC was paying the contracted royalties to Iran, and to limit their control over Iranian oil reserves. Upon the AIOC's refusal to cooperate with the Iranian government, the Iranian parliament (the Majlis) voted to nationalize Iran's oil industry (March 1951) and to expel foreign corporate representatives from the country. After this vote, Britain instigated a worldwide boycott of Iranian oil to pressure Iran economically. Initially, Britain mobilized its military to seize control of the British-built Abadan oil refinery, then the world's largest, but the U.K. Prime Minister Clement Attlee opted instead to tighten the economic boycott while using agents to undermine Mosaddegh's government. Judging Mosaddegh to be unamenable and fearing the growing influence of the communist Tudeh, Attlee's successor as UK prime minister, Winston Churchill, decided in early 1953 to solicit the Eisenhower administration and to overthrow Iran's government. The preceding Truman administration had opposed a coup, fearing the precedent that Central Intelligence Agency involvement would set, and the U.S. government had been considering unilateral action (without UK support) to assist the Mosaddegh government as late as 1952. British intelligence and the UK government's solicitations to the US were instrumental in initiating and planning the coup. In the week before the coup, Mosaddegh consolidated power through a controversial referendum to dissolve parliament.

The events of the coup unfolded between 15 and 19 of August, after months of planning by the United States' CIA, and United Kingdom's MI6. On 15 August, an officer of the Imperial Guard of the Shah (Persian for 'king') was dispatched to Tehran to deliver the Shah's dismissal decree to Mosaddegh. Mosaddegh's supporters arrested the officer on arrival, and the Shah, Mohammed Reza Pahlavi fled to Italy shortly afterward. After the Shah had left, a wave of protests organized by the CIA failed to overthrow Mosaddegh. Although the initial attempt failed, the CIA continued coordinating with royalist networks, clerical figures, and elements of the military. On 19 August, demonstrators and military units backed by the CIA gained control of key institutions in Tehran and seized the government, leading to Mosaddegh's overthrow on 19 August, allowing the Shah to return to Iran on 22 August.

Following the coup, General Fazlollah Zahedi, who had led the military units in support of the coup, formed a government which allowed the Shah of Iran to rule more firmly as monarch. After his return to Iran, the Shah relied heavily on United States support to retain power. According to the CIA's declassified documents and records, the CIA hired some of the most feared mobsters in Tehran to stage pro-shah riots on 19 August. Other men paid by the CIA were brought into Tehran in buses and trucks and took over the streets of the city. Between 200 and 300 people were killed because of the conflict. Mosaddegh was arrested, tried and convicted of treason by the Shah's military court. On 21 December 1953, he was sentenced to three years in jail; he remained under house arrest until he died in 1967. Mosaddegh supporters were imprisoned, and several received the death penalty. The coup strengthened the Shah's authority, and he continued to rule Iran for the next 26 years as an authoritarian, pro-Western monarch, until overthrown in the Iranian Revolution in 1979.

In August 2013, the U.S. government formally acknowledged the U.S. role in the coup by releasing a bulk of previously classified government documents that show it was in charge both of the planning and of the execution of the coup. According to American journalist Stephen Kinzer, the operation included false-flag attacks, paid protesters, provocations, the bribing of Iranian politicians and of high-ranking security and army officials, as well as pro-coup propaganda. The CIA is quoted as acknowledging that the coup took place "under CIA direction" and "as an act of U.S. foreign policy, conceived and approved at the highest levels of government". In 2023, the CIA took credit for the coup, this confirmed what many historians had already concluded previously, though because portions of the agency's records were destroyed, or remained classified for years, some historians had initially argued, on the basis of incomplete evidence, that Iranian domestic actors played the primary role in the coup, with the U.S. and Britain serving mainly in a supporting capacity.

== Background ==
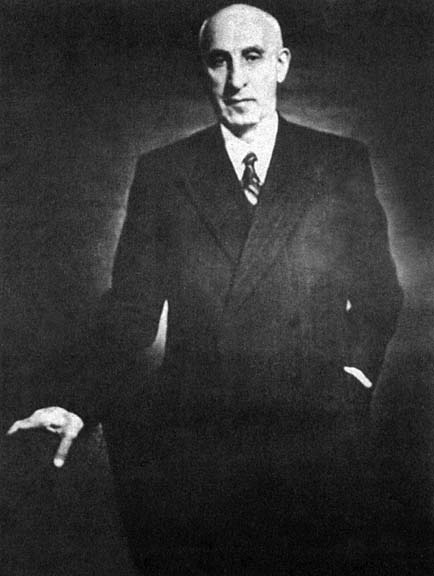
Mohammad Mosaddegh, the Prime Minister of Iran in 1951

Throughout the 19th century, Iran was caught between two competing powers, Russia and Britain. In 1892, the British diplomat George Curzon described Iran as "pieces on a chessboard upon which is being played out a game for the dominion of the world." During the latter half of the 19th century, the concession policies of the Qajar monarchy faced increasing opposition. In 1872, a representative of British entrepreneur Paul Reuter met with the Iranian monarch Naser al-Din Shah Qajar and agreed to fund the monarch's upcoming lavish visit to Europe in return for exclusive contracts for Iranian roads, telegraphs, mills, factories, extraction of resources, and other public works, in which Reuter would receive a stipulated sum for five years and 60% of all the net revenue for 20 years. However, the Reuter concession was never put into effect because of violent opposition at home and from Russia. In 1892, the monarch was forced to revoke a tobacco monopoly given to Major G. F. Talbot, following protests and a widespread tobacco boycott.

In 1901, Mozaffar ad-Din Shah Qajar granted a 60-year petroleum search concession to William Knox D'Arcy. D'Arcy paid £20,000 (equivalent to £2.8 million in 2024), according to journalist-turned-historian Stephen Kinzer, and promised equal ownership shares, with 16% of any future net profit, as calculated by the company. However, the historian L. P. Elwell-Sutton wrote, in 1955, that "Persia's share was 'hardly spectacular' and no money changed hands." On 31 July 1907, D'Arcy withdrew from his private holdings in Persia, and transferred them to the British-owned Burmah Oil Company. On 26 May 1908, British geologist George Bernard Reynolds struck oil at a depth of 1,180 feet (360 m). The company grew slowly until World War I, when Persia's strategic importance led the British government to buy a controlling share in the company, essentially nationalizing British oil production in Iran.

The British angered the Persians by intervening in their domestic affairs, including in the Persian Constitutional Revolution. widespread protests had forced Mozzafar al-Din Shah to allow for the Constitution of 1906, which limited his powers. It allowed for a parliament elected by the people to make the laws, and a prime minister to sign and carry them out. The prime minister would be confirmed by the shah after a vote in Parliament. Nevertheless, the new constitution gave the shah many executive powers as well. It allowed for the shah to issue royal decrees (Firman), gave him the power to dismiss prime ministers, appoint half of the members of the Senate (which was not convened until 1949), and introduce bills to dissolve Parliament. It abolished arbitrary rule, but the shah served as an executive, rather than in a ceremonial role. The Constitutional Revolution was opposed by the British and Russians, who attempted to subvert it through the backing of Mohammad Ali Shah Qajar (the son of Mozzafar-e-din Shah), who tried to break up the democratic government by force. A guerrilla movement led by Sattar Khan deposed him in 1910.

In the aftermath of World War I there was widespread political dissatisfaction with the royalty terms of the British petroleum concession, under the Anglo-Persian Oil Company (APOC), whereby Persia received 16% of "net profits". In 1921, after years of severe mismanagement under the Qajar dynasty, a coup d'état (allegedly backed by the British) brought a general, Reza Khan, into the government. By 1923, he had become prime minister, and gained a reputation as an effective politician with a lack of corruption. By 1925 under his influence, Parliament voted to remove Ahmad Shah Qajar from the throne, and Reza Khan was crowned Reza Shah Pahlavi, of the Pahlavi dynasty. Reza Shah began a rapid and successful modernization program in Persia, which up until that point had been considered to be among the most impoverished countries in the world. Nevertheless, Reza Shah was also a harsh ruler who did not tolerate dissent. By the 1930s, he had suppressed all opposition, and had sidelined the democratic aspects of the constitution. Opponents were jailed and in some cases even executed. While some agreed with his policies, arguing that it was necessary as Iran was in such turmoil, others argued that it was unjustified. One such opponent was a politician named Mohammad Mosaddegh, who was jailed in 1940. The experience gave him a lasting dislike for authoritarian rule and monarchy, and it helped make Mosaddegh a dedicated advocate of complete oil nationalization in Iran.

Reza Shah largely succeeded in attenuating the power of the colonial forces in Iran. However, he also needed them to help modernize the country. He did so by balancing the influence of various colonial powers, including that of Britain and Germany. In the 1930s, Reza Shah tried to terminate the APOC concession that the Qajar dynasty had granted, but Iran was still weak and Britain would not allow it. The concession was renegotiated on terms again favorable to the British (although the D'Arcy Concession was softened). On 21 March 1935, Reza Shah changed the name of the country from Persia to Iran. The Anglo-Persian Oil Company was then renamed the Anglo-Iranian Oil Company (AIOC).

After World War II had broken out, Reza Shah had declared Iran's neutrality, and attempted to appease the British, Soviets and Germans, all of whom maintained a degree of influence in Iran. In 1941, after the German invasion of the Soviet Union, British and Soviet forces invaded and occupied Iran, which was largely unopposed by the Iranian government and military. The primary reasons behind the Anglo-Soviet invasion was to remove German influence in Iran and secure control over Iran's oil fields and the Trans-Iranian Railway in order to deliver supplies to the USSR. Reza Shah was deposed and exiled by the British to South Africa, and his 22-year-old son Mohammad Reza Pahlavi was installed as the new Shah of Iran. Mohammad Reza Pahlavi was supported by the Allies because they viewed him as being less able to act against their interests in Iran. The new Shah, unlike his father, was initially a mild leader and at times indecisive. During the 1940s he did not for most part take an independent role in the government, and much of Reza Shah's authoritarian policies were rolled back. Iranian democracy effectively was restored during this period as a result.

The British occupation force withdrew from Iran after the end of the war. However, under Joseph Stalin, the Soviet Union's partly remained by sponsoring two People's Democratic Republics within Iran's borders. The related conflict was ended when the US lobbied for the Iranian Army to reassert control over the two occupied territories. The earlier agreed-upon Soviet–Iranian oil agreement would never be honored. Nationalist leaders in Iran became influential by looking for a reduction in long-term foreign interventions in their country—especially the oil concession which was profitable for the West and little profitable for Iran.

U.S. objectives in the Middle East remained the same between 1947 and 1952 but its strategy changed. Washington remained "publicly in solidarity and privately at odds" with Britain, its World War II ally. Britain's empire was steadily weakening, and with an eye on international crises, the U.S. re-appraised its interests and the risks of being identified with British colonial interests. "In Saudi Arabia, to Britain's extreme disapproval, Washington endorsed the arrangement between ARAMCO and Saudi Arabia in the 50/50 accord that had reverberations throughout the region."

Iran's oil had been discovered and later controlled by the British-owned AIOC. Popular discontent with the AIOC began in the late 1940s: a large segment of Iran's public and a number of politicians saw the company as exploitative and a central tool of continued British imperialism in Iran.

== Oil nationalization crisis ==
=== Assassination attempt on the Shah; Mosaddegh becomes prime minister ===
In 1949, an assassin attempted to kill the Shah. Shocked by the experience and emboldened by public sympathy for his injury, the Shah began to take an increasingly active role in politics. He quickly organized the Iran Constituent Assembly to amend the constitution to increase his powers. He established the Senate of Iran, which had been a part of the Constitution of 1906 but had never been convened. The Shah had the right to appoint half the senators, and he chose men sympathetic to his aims. Mosaddegh thought this increase in the Shah's political power was not democratic; he believed that the Shah should "reign, but not rule" in a manner similar to Europe's constitutional monarchies. Led by Mosaddegh, political parties and opponents of the Shah's policies banded together to form a coalition known as the National Front. Oil nationalization was a major policy goal for the coalition.

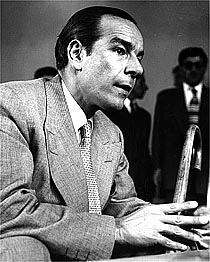
Hossein Fatemi, Iran's Minister of Foreign Affairs

By 1951, the National Front had won majority seats for the popularly elected Majlis (Parliament of Iran). According to Iran's constitution, the majority elected party in the parliament would choose its prime minister candidate by vote, after which the Shah would confirm the candidate to power. The Prime Minister Ali Razmara, who opposed the oil nationalization, was assassinated by the hardline Fadaiyan e-Islam (whose spiritual leader was the Ayatollah Abol-Qassem Kashani, a mentor to the future Ayatollah Ruhollah Khomeini,). After the National Front dominated the voting in Parliament, Mosaddegh was confirmed prime Minister of Iran by the Shah (replacing Hossein Ala', who had replaced Razmara). Under heavy pressure by the National Front, the assassin of Razmara (Khalil Tahmasebi) was released and pardoned. For the time being, Mosaddegh and Kashani were allies of convenience, as Mosaddegh saw that Kashani could mobilize the "religious masses", while Kashani wanted Mosaddegh to drive out British and other foreign influence. Kashani's Fadaiyan mobs often violently attacked the opponents of nationalization and opponents of the National Front government, as well as "immoral objects", acting at times as unofficial "enforcers" for the movement. However, by late 1952 Mosaddegh was becoming increasingly opposed to Kashani, as the latter was contributing to mass political instability in Iran. Kashani in turn, berated Mosaddegh for not "Islamizing" Iran, as he (Mosaddegh) was a firm believer in the separation of religion and state.

The Shah and his new prime minister Mosaddegh had an antagonistic relationship. Part of the problem stemmed from the fact that Mosaddegh was connected by blood to the former royal Qajar dynasty, and saw the Pahlavi king as a usurper to the throne but the real issue stemmed from the fact that Mosaddegh represented a pro-democratic force that wanted to temper the Shah's rule in Iranian politics. He wanted the Shah to be a ceremonial monarch rather than a ruling monarch, thus giving the elected government power instead of the un-elected Shah. While the constitution of Iran gave the Shah the power to rule directly, Mosaddegh used the united National Front bloc and the widespread popular support for the oil nationalization vote (the latter which the Shah supported as well) in order to block the Shah's ability to act. As a result, the oil nationalization issue became increasingly intertwined with Mosaddegh's pro-democracy movement. The dejected Shah was angered by Mosaddegh's "insolence" (according to Abbas Milani, he angrily paced in the rooms of his palace at the thought that he would be reduced to a figurehead) but Mosaddegh and the oil nationalization's popularity prevented the Shah from acting against his prime minister (which was allowed under Iran's constitution), something that Mosaddegh felt a king had no right to do. In 1952 the Shah dismissed Mosaddegh, replacing him with Ahmad Qavam (a veteran prime minister) but widespread protests by Mosaddegh supporters resulted in the Shah immediately reinstating him.

=== Oil nationalization, the Abadan crisis, and rising tensions ===
In late 1951, Iran's Parliament in a near unanimous vote approved the oil nationalization agreement. The bill was widely popular among most Iranians, and generated a huge wave of nationalism, and immediately put Iran at loggerheads with Britain (the handful of MPs that disagreed with it voted for it as well in the face of overwhelming popular support, and the Fadaiyan's wrath). The nationalization made Mosaddegh instantly popular among millions of Iranians, cementing him as a national hero, and placing him and Iran at the center of worldwide attention.

Britain now faced the newly elected nationalist government in Iran where Mosaddegh, with strong backing of the Iranian parliament and people, demanded more favorable concessionary arrangements, which Britain vigorously opposed.

The U.S. State Department not only rejected Britain's demand that it continue to be the primary beneficiary of Iranian oil reserves, but "U.S. international oil interests were among the beneficiaries of the concessionary arrangements that followed nationalization."

Mohammad Mosaddegh attempted to negotiate with the AIOC, but the company rejected his proposed compromise. Mosaddegh's plan, based on the 1948 compromise between the Venezuelan Government of Rómulo Gallegos and Creole Petroleum, would divide the profits from oil 50/50 between Iran and Britain. Against the recommendation of the United States, Britain refused this proposal and began planning to undermine and overthrow the Iranian government.

In July 1951, the American diplomat W. Averell Harriman went to Iran to negotiate an Anglo-Iranian compromise, asking the Shah's help; his reply was that "in the face of public opinion, there was no way he could say a word against nationalisation". Harriman held a press conference in Tehran, calling for reason and enthusiasm in confronting the "nationalisation crisis". As soon as he spoke, a journalist rose and shouted: "We and the Iranian people all support Premier Mosaddegh and oil nationalisation!" Everyone present began cheering and then marched out of the room; the abandoned Harriman shook his head in dismay.

By September 1951, the British had virtually ceased Abadan oil field production, forbidden British export to Iran of key British commodities (including sugar and steel), and had frozen Iran's hard currency accounts in British banks. British Prime Minister Clement Attlee considered seizing the Abadan Oil Refinery by force, but instead settled on an embargo by the Royal Navy, stopping any ship transporting Iranian oil for carrying so-called "stolen property". On his re-election as prime minister, Winston Churchill took an even harder stance against Iran.

On a visit to the United States in October 1951, Mosaddegh—in spite of the popularity of nationalization in Iran—agreed in talks with George C. McGhee to a complex settlement of the crisis involving the sale of the Abadan Refinery to a non-British company and Iranian control of the extraction of crude oil. The US waited until Winston Churchill became prime minister to present the deal, believing he would be more flexible, but the deal was rejected by the British.

The United Kingdom took its anti-nationalization case against Iran to the International Court of Justice at The Hague; PM Mosaddegh said the world would learn of a "cruel and imperialistic country" stealing from a "needy and naked people". The court ruled that it had no jurisdiction over the case. Nevertheless, the British continued to enforce the embargo of Iranian oil. In August 1952, Iranian Prime Minister Mosaddegh invited an American oil executive to visit Iran and the Truman administration welcomed the invitation. However, the suggestion upset Churchill, who insisted that the U.S. not undermine his campaign to isolate Mosaddegh because of British support for the U.S. in the Korean War.

In mid-1952, Britain's embargo of Iranian oil was devastatingly effective. British agents in Tehran "worked to subvert" the government of Mosaddegh, who sought help from President Truman and then the World Bank but to no avail. "Iranians were becoming poorer and unhappier by the day" and Mosaddegh's political coalition was fraying. To make matters worse, the Speaker of the Parliament Ayatollah Kashani, Mosaddegh's main clerical supporter, became increasingly opposed to the Prime Minister, because Mosaddegh was squeezing him out of power. By 1953, he had completely turned on him, and supported the coup, depriving Mosaddegh of religious support, while giving it to the Shah. He was joined in this by a younger and relatively unknown mullah Ruhollah Khomeini, Iran's future revolutionary supreme leader who also condemned the Mossadegh government.

While the National Front, which often supported Mosaddegh, won handily in the big cities, there was no one to monitor voting in the rural areas. Violence broke out in Abadan and other parts of the country where elections were hotly contested. Faced with having to leave Iran for The Hague where Britain was suing for control of Iranian oil, Mosaddegh's cabinet voted to postpone the remainder of the election until after the return of the Iranian delegation from The Hague:

While Mosaddegh dealt with political challenge, he faced another that most Iranians considered far more urgent. The British blockade of Iranian seaports meant that Iran was left without access to markets where it could sell its oil. The embargo had the effect of causing Iran to spiral into bankruptcy. Tens of thousands had lost their jobs at the Abadan refinery, and although most understood and passionately supported the idea of nationalisation, they naturally hoped that Mosaddegh would find a way to put them back to work. The only way he could do that was to sell oil.

To make matters worse, the Communist Tudeh Party, which supported the Soviet Union and had attempted to kill the Shah only four years earlier, began to infiltrate the military and send mobs to "support Mosaddegh" (but in reality to marginalize all non-Communist opponents). Earlier, the Tudeh had denounced Mosaddegh, but by 1953 they changed tack and decided to "support" him. The Tudeh violently attacked opponents under the guise of helping the prime minister (the cousin of the future queen of Iran, Farah Pahlavi, was stabbed at the age of 13 in his school by Tudeh activists), and unwittingly helped cause Mosaddegh's reputation to decline, despite the fact that he never officially endorsed them. However, by 1953 he and the Tudeh had formed an unofficial alliance of convenience with each other; the Tudeh were the "foot soldiers" for his government, effectively replacing the Fadaiyan in that role, all the while secretly hoping that Mosaddegh would institute communism.

Worried about Britain's other interests in Iran, and thanks to the Tudeh Party, believing that Iran's nationalism was really a Soviet-backed plot, Britain persuaded US Secretary of State John Foster Dulles that Iran was falling to the Soviets—effectively exploiting the American Cold War mindset. Since President Harry S. Truman was busy fighting a war in Korea, he did not agree to overthrow the government of Prime Minister Mohammad Mosaddegh. However, in 1953, when Dwight D. Eisenhower became president, the UK convinced the U.S. to undertake a joint coup d'état.

=== Final months of Mosaddegh's government ===
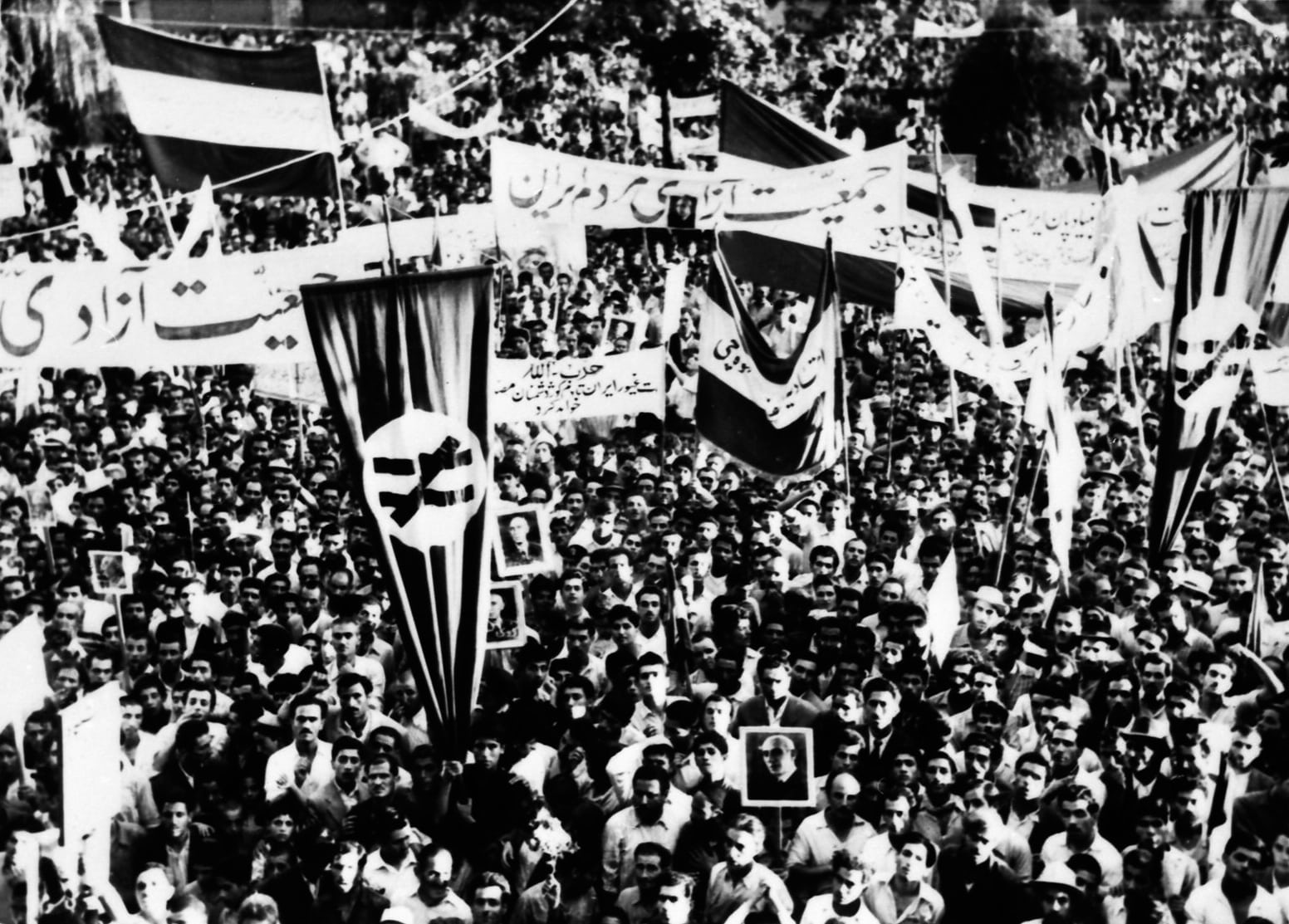
Pro-Mosaddegh protests in Tehran, 16 August 1953

By 1953, economic tensions caused by the British embargo and political turmoil began to take a major toll on Mosaddegh's popularity and political power. He was increasingly blamed for the economic and political crisis. Political violence was becoming widespread in the form of street clashes between rival political groups. Mosaddegh was losing popularity and support among the working class which had been his strongest supporters. As he lost support, he became more autocratic. As early as August 1952, he began to rely on emergency powers to rule, generating controversy among his supporters. After an assassination attempt upon one of his cabinet ministers and himself, he ordered the jailing of dozens of his political opponents. This act created widespread anger among the general public, and led to accusations that Mosaddegh was becoming a dictator. The Tudeh Party's unofficial alliance with Mosaddegh led to fears of communism, and increasingly it was the communists who were taking part in pro-Mosaddegh rallies and attacking opponents.

By mid-1953 a mass of resignations by Mosaddegh's parliamentary supporters reduced the National Front seats in Parliament. In early August, a week before the coup, a referendum to dissolve parliament and give the prime minister power to make law was submitted to voters, and it passed with 99.9 percent approval, 2,043,300 votes to 1300 votes against. The referendum was boycotted by opposition figures and the result was described as fraudulent by many observers. It was widely seen by opponents as treason and an act against the Shah, who was stripped of military power and control over national resources. This act would be one of many key factors in a chain of events leading to Mosaddegh's deposition.

The Shah himself initially opposed the coup plans and supported the oil nationalization, but he joined in after being informed by the CIA that he too would be "deposed" if he did not cooperate. The experience left him with a lifelong awe of American power and would contribute to his pro-US policies while generating a hatred of the British. Mosaddegh's decision to dissolve Parliament also contributed to his decision.

== Execution of Operation Ajax ==
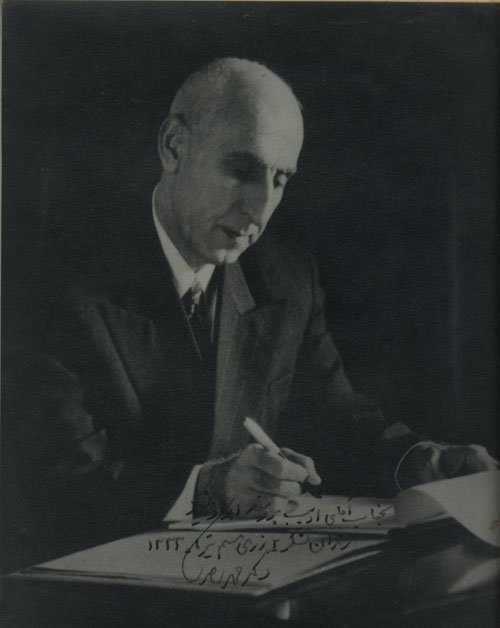
Mohammad Mosaddegh, the leader of National Front and the elected Prime Minister of Iran

The official pretext for the start of the coup was Mosaddegh's decree to dissolve Parliament, giving himself and his cabinet complete power to rule, while effectively stripping the Shah of his powers. It resulted in him being accused of giving himself "total and dictatorial powers." The Shah, who had been resisting the CIA's demands for the coup, finally agreed to support it. Having obtained the Shah's concurrence, the CIA executed the coup. Firmans (royal decrees) dismissing Mosaddegh and appointing General Fazlollah Zahedi (a loyalist who had helped Reza Shah reunify Iran decades earlier) were drawn up by the coup plotters and signed by the Shah. Having signed the decrees and delivered them to General Zahedi, he and Queen Soraya departed for a week-long vacation in northern Iran.

On Saturday 15 August, Colonel Nematollah Nassiri, the commander of the Imperial Guard, along with other elements of his military network, arrested various members of Mosaddegh's government, including Mossadegh's deputy Chief of Staff Ataollah Kiyani, Foreign Minister Hossein Fatemi, the pro-Mosadegh deputy and co-founder of the National Front of Iran Ahmad Zirakzadeh, and his Minister of Roads, Jahangir Haqshenas. The military then proceeded to seize and neutralise the telephone centre in Tehran that processed and serviced all calls to and from key government buildings. Mosaddegh had been warned of the plans to overthrow his government by the Tudeh Party, whose cells had infiltrated the military. Nassiri also handed over another signed order from the Shah to Major General Fazlollah Zahedi, according to which Zahedi would be appointed Prime Minister after the dismissal of Mosaddegh. Fearing the forces loyal to Mosaddegh, Zahedi had been hiding in a safehouse.

On Sunday 16 August at around 1 a.m., Colonel Nassiri, personally delivered to Mosaddegh the firman (decree) from the Shah dismissing him, but Mossadegh refused to grant Nassiri an audience in person. Instead, he instructed Colonel Ezzatollah Momtaz, an officer of the Prime Minister's Office's Security Guard to intercept Nassiri, retrieved the document and brought it to his quarters. After reading the firman, he rejected it and immediately had Nassiri arrested.

According to Mosaddegh, he rejected the firman for several reasons - in court, he claimed that he was suspicious of the authenticity of the firman; that he believed the date of the firman had been tampered with and was issued prior to the dissolution of the Majlis and thus was unconstitutional as the Shah had not acquired the approval of the Majlis; that the edict being concurrent with a series of military operations against his government the day before had led him to believe that this was a foreign coup in the guise of a royal edict; while in a meeting with Loy W. Henderson on 18 August, Mossadegh argued that regardless of the authenticity of any firman dismissing him, he would ignore it, as in his view, the Shah had no authority to dismiss him as a purely constitutional monarch.

The Shah, who was in his villa in Kelardasht, was informed at around 4 a.m. by the Imperial Guard that the mission assigned to Nassiri had failed. Accompanied by his second wife Soraya and trusted confidant Aboul Fath Atabay, they immediately fled on a small plane first to Ramsar and on to Baghdad. Arriving unannounced, the Shah asked for permission for himself and his consort to stay in Baghdad for a few days before continuing on to Europe. After high-level Government consultations, they were escorted to the White House, the Iraqi Government's guest house, where King Faisal II received him with reverence. The Shah stayed in Iraq for only one day, and after a brief pilgrimage to Imam Husayn Shrine in Karbala, was flown to Italy in a plane piloted by Mohammad Amir Khatami.

After the dismissal attempt failed, General Zahedi, along with his son, Ardeshir Zahedi, Gilanshah, and the Rashidiyan brothers, all took refuge in the safe custody of a CIA station in Tehran. Following the arrest of Nassiri, Mosaddegh informed Army Chief of Staff Brigadier General Taghi Riahi of the situation. According to some accounts, Mosaddegh initially prepared a radio address acknowledging his dismissal and urged the public to determine the country's future, but the message was not broadcast. The news of the royal decree was withheld from the public and instead, a radio announcement was broadcast on the morning of 16 August that an attempted coup by members of the Imperial Guard had been foiled.

Mosaddegh ordered security forces to capture the coup plotters, and dozens were imprisoned. Meanwhile, Mossaddegh's associates were released from custody. After consulations with close associates, including Foreign Minister Fatemi, Mosaddegh would continue to exercise his functions as Prime Minister. The CIA was ordered to leave Iran, although Kermit Roosevelt Jr. was slow to receive the message—allegedly due to MI6 interference—and eagerly continued to foment anti-Mosaddegh unrest. The Eisenhower administration considered changing its policy to support Mosaddegh, with undersecretary of state Walter Bedell Smith remarking on 17 August: "Whatever his faults, Mosaddegh had no love for the Russians and timely aid might enable him to keep Communism in check."

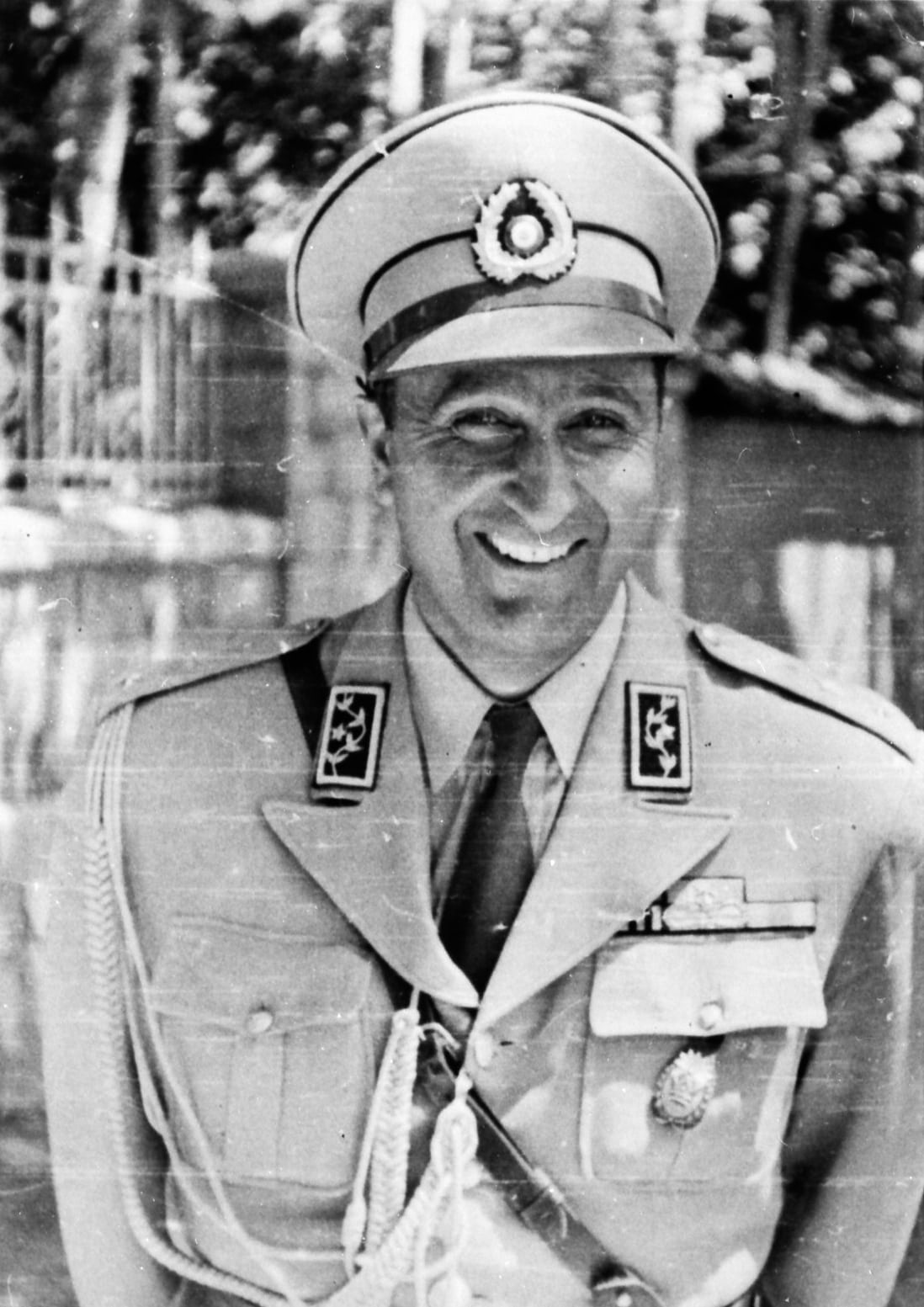
Nematollah Nassiri

General Zahedi, who was still on the run but had already publicly proclaimed himself as the rightful Prime Minister, secretly met with the pro-Shah Ayatollah Mohammad Behbahani and other Shah supporters. Backed by CIA money (derisively known as "Behbahani dollars"), they developed a strategy to stoke class and religious resentment toward the Mosaddegh government. The Shah's flight from Iran, Mosaddegh's arrests of political opponents, and fears of communism had already soured many upper-class Iranians on the prime minister. The plotters sought to capitalize on these anxieties. The Ayatollah Behbahani also used his influence to rally religious demonstrators against Mosaddegh. Zahedi

Meanwhile, in the days that followed, Mosaddegh's supporters became divided over the political situation. A radical faction led by Fatemi called for the abolition of the monarchy and the establishment of a republic while Fatemi himself took part in several large protests with Tudeh Party supporters in which statues of Reza Shah and Mohammad Reza Pahlavi, which had been erected in Tehran's major squares and other cities, were pulled down. A more moderate faction, which included Mosaddegh, instead favored preserving the constitutional framework while replacing the Shah with a regency or a royal council. Concerns over the growing influence of the communist Tudeh Party contributed to these internal divisions.

As political tensions intensified on 18 August, General Zahedi distributed copies of the Shah's signed decree to the public. At the same time, leading bazaar merchants appealed to Grand Ayatollah Hossein Borujerdi who subsequently expressed support for the Shah and recognized Zahedi's appointment. Borujerdi permitted the closure of bazaars and allowed the merchants to mobilize the protests against Mosaddegh and the Tudeh Party. Ayatollah Mohammad Behbahani and Ayatollah Abol-Ghasem Kashani likewise mobilized their supporters to march and seize government offices that were held by Mosaddegh loyalists despite their longstanding political differences. Most military units in and around Tehran also refused to recognize Mosaddegh's authority and remained loyal to the Shah and Zahedi. Only the Prime Minister's Residence Guard remained loyal to Mosaddegh.

On 19 August, Mosaddegh issued a decree banning all demonstrations on that day. The mobilization of crowds and street protests was later widely believed to have been organized with CIA assistance, had occurred to create the impression of popular unrest and opposition to Mosaddegh's government. Bloody street battles were observed to have broken out in Tehran between Tudeh Party activists and right wing parties, whose offices were attacked by the communists. At the same time pro-Shah crowds began gathering in the streets. By the middle of the day, large crowds of regular citizens, armed with improvised weapons, took to the streets in mass demonstrations, and beat back the Tudeh Party members. Under Zahedi's authority, the army left its barracks and drove off the communist Tudeh and then stormed all government buildings with the support of demonstrators.

A large crowd of Tehran residents began to gather around Mosaddegh's house to seize the main base of the government. The Residence Guard opened fire on the crowd and resisted for several hours. Nearly 40 people, mostly civilians, were killed by Mosaddegh's Guard. At around 4.30 p.m. on 19 August, Brigadier General Nosratollah Fooladvand went to Mosaddegh's residence to warn Mosaddegh that resisting surrender would further anger the protesters who might lynch him and called for his surrender. Mosaddegh, who was bedridden and ill, finally gave in and as a sign of surrender, a piece of Mosaddegh's white bed sheet was hung above the entrance of his home. He then surreptitiously fled from his home. By the end of the day, Zahedi and the army were in control of the government and the country.

General Zahedi then made an official plea to Mosaddegh to turn himself in and a promise that his safety would be guaranteed. He would also receive the respect deserving of a former Prime Minister, conditions which compelled Mosaddegh to concede on 21 August. Military officers were prohibited from mistreating Mosaddegh during his arrest and according to one account, the soldiers who were assigned to arrest Mosaddegh greeted him with military salutes as he shook their hands. To prevent further bloodshed, Mosaddegh refused a last attempt to organize his supporters.

According to Hugh Wilford in his book published in 2013, despite the CIA's role in creating the conditions for the coup, there was little evidence to prove that Kermit Roosevelt Jr. or other CIA officials were directly responsible for the actions of the demonstrators or the army on 19 August. It has even been suggested that Roosevelt's activities between 15 and 19 August were primarily intended to organize "stay-behind networks as part of the planned CIA evacuation of the country", although they allowed him to later "claim responsibility for the day's outcome." In 2014, historian Ray Takeyh stated that the US-led coup attempt failed, citing how the CIA wrote to Eisenhower that "The move failed [...] We now [...] probably have to snuggle up to Mosaddeq if we're going to save [our influence in Iran];" the demonstrations that led to Mosaddegh's resignation took place some weeks after the Roosevelt-organized ones, and were composed of average citizens, not the thugs-for-hire that the CIA and MI6 had recruited. Also in 2014, on the other hand, historian Ali Rahnema writes that the British and the Americans had a contingency plan in place in case the firman dismissing Mosaddegh had failed; in a joint SIS-CIA meeting in mid-June 1953, they had planned that if Mosaddegh was to reject the firman dismissing him, Asadollah Rashidiyan would use CIA and SIS funds to unleash his network of ruffians, thugs, and supporters among the underclass, in Southern Tehran to stage mass protests against the government, before being joined by the military. Meanwhile, in 2017, the CIA released documents revealing that the networks established by British intelligence services had been used to run a campaign of propaganda and paid-for protests, resulting in the rapid destabilization of the nation. Scholars Roham Alvandi and Mark J. Gasiorowski wrote in 2019, Ray Takeyh's view would be based on a "deeply flawed and highly selective reading" of the available evidence.

The Shah stayed in a hotel in Italy until he learned what had transpired, upon which he "chokingly declared": "I knew they loved me." Allen Dulles, the director of the CIA, flew back with the Shah from Rome to Tehran on 22 August. Zahedi officially replaced Mosaddegh. Mosaddegh was arrested, tried, and originally sentenced to death but on the Shah's personal orders, his sentence was commuted to three years' solitary confinement in a military prison, followed by house arrest in his home village of Ahmadabad until his death.

== United States' role ==
As a condition for restoring the Anglo-Iranian Oil Company, in 1954 the US required removal of the AIOC's monopoly; five American petroleum companies, Royal Dutch Shell, and the Compagnie Française des Pétroles were to draw Iran's petroleum after the successful coup d'état—Operation Ajax. The Shah declared this to be a "victory" for Iranians, with the massive influx of money from this agreement resolving the economic collapse from the last three years, and allowing him to carry out his planned modernization projects.

As part of that, the CIA organized anti-Communist guerrillas to fight the Tudeh Party if they seized power in the chaos of Operation Ajax. Released National Security Archive documents showed that Undersecretary of State Walter Bedell Smith reported that the CIA had agreed with Qashqai tribal leaders, in south Iran, to establish a clandestine safe haven from which U.S.-funded guerrillas and spies could operate.

The CIA sent Major General Norman Schwarzkopf Sr. to persuade the exiled Shah to return to rule Iran. Schwarzkopf trained the security forces that would become known as SAVAK to secure the Shah's hold on power.

According to a heavily redacted CIA document released to the National Security Archive in response to a Freedom of Information request, "Available documents do not indicate who authorized CIA to begin planning the operation, but it almost certainly was President Eisenhower himself. Eisenhower biographer Stephen E. Ambrose has written that the absence of documentation reflected the President's style."

The CIA document then quotes from the Ambrose biography of Eisenhower:

Before going into the operation, Ajax had to have the approval of the President. Eisenhower participated in none of the meetings that set up Ajax; he received only oral reports on the plan; and he did not discuss it with his Cabinet or the NSC. Establishing a pattern he would hold to throughout his Presidency, he kept his distance and left no documents behind that could implicate the President in any projected coup. But in the privacy of the Oval Office, over cocktails, he was kept informed by Foster Dulles, and he maintained a tight control over the activities of the CIA.

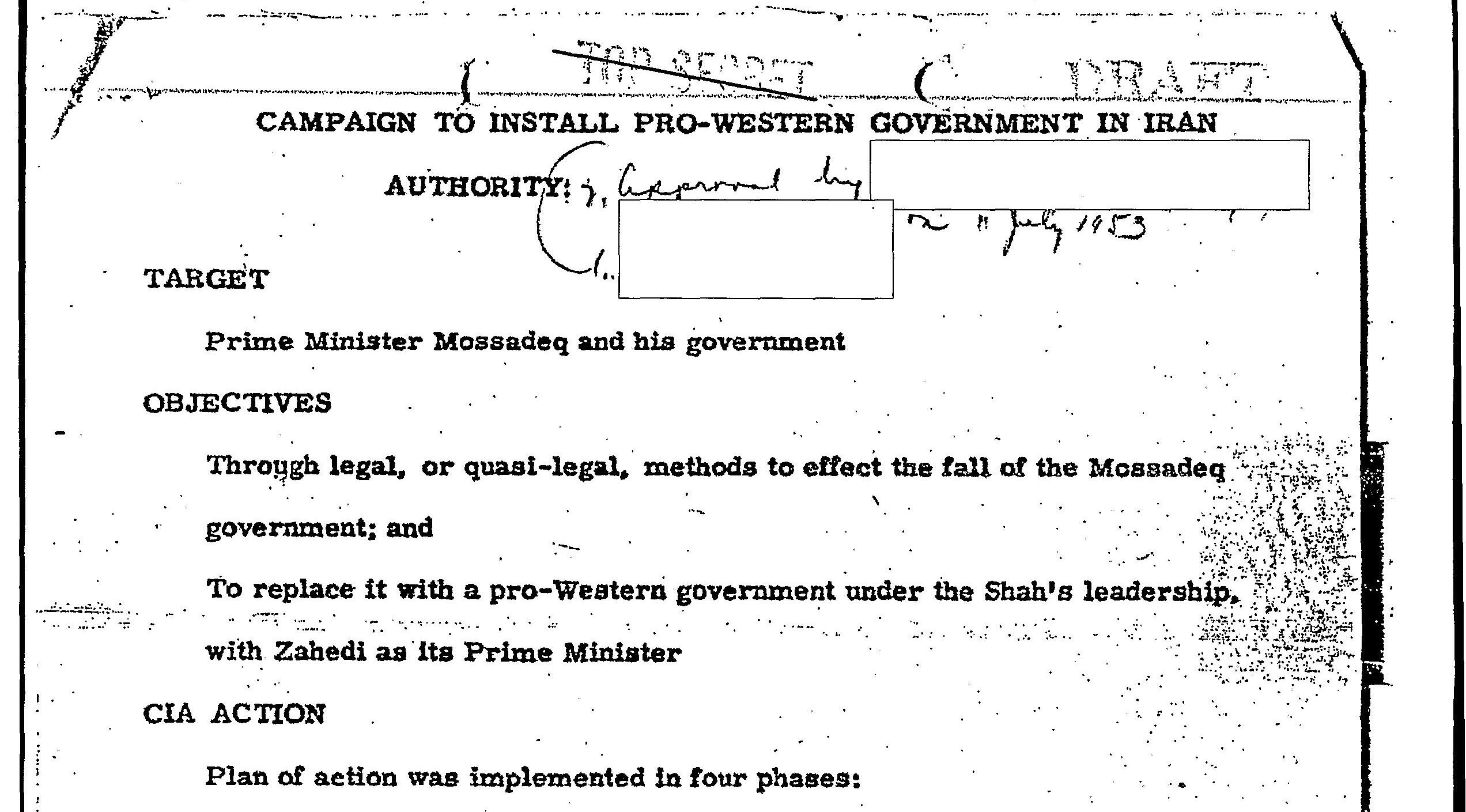
Confirmation for execution of Operation Ajax

One version of the CIA history, written by Wilber, referred to the operation as TPAJAX.

A tactic Roosevelt admitted to using was bribing demonstrators into attacking symbols of the Shah, while chanting pro-Mosaddegh slogans. As king, the Shah was largely seen as a symbol of Iran at the time by many Iranians and monarchists. Roosevelt declared that the more that these agents showed their hate for the Shah and attacked his symbols, the more it caused the average Iranian citizen to dislike and distrust Mosaddegh.

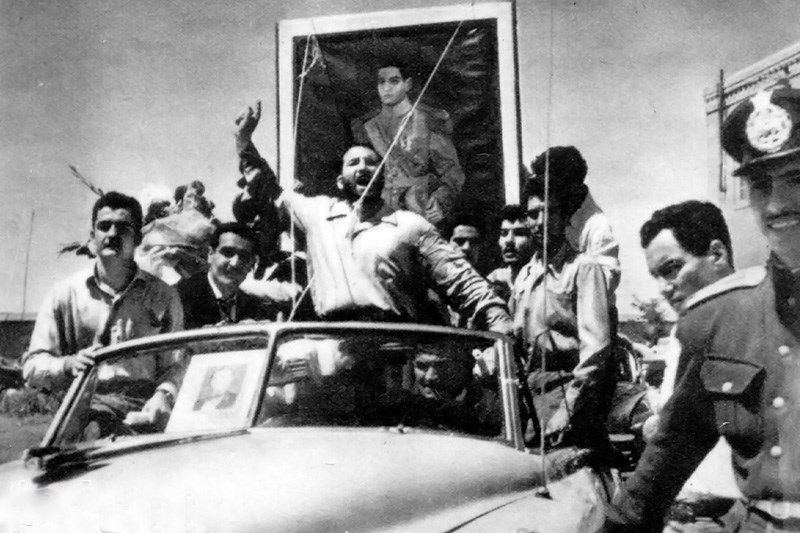
Shaban Jafari, commonly known as Shaban the Brainless (Shaban Bimokh), was a notable pro-Shah strongman and thug. He led his men and other bribed street thugs and was a prominent figure during the coup.

The British and American spy agencies strengthened the monarchy in Iran by backing the pro-western Shah for the next 26 years. The Shah was overthrown in 1979. Some Iranian clerics cooperated with the western spy agencies because they were dissatisfied with Mosaddegh's secular government.

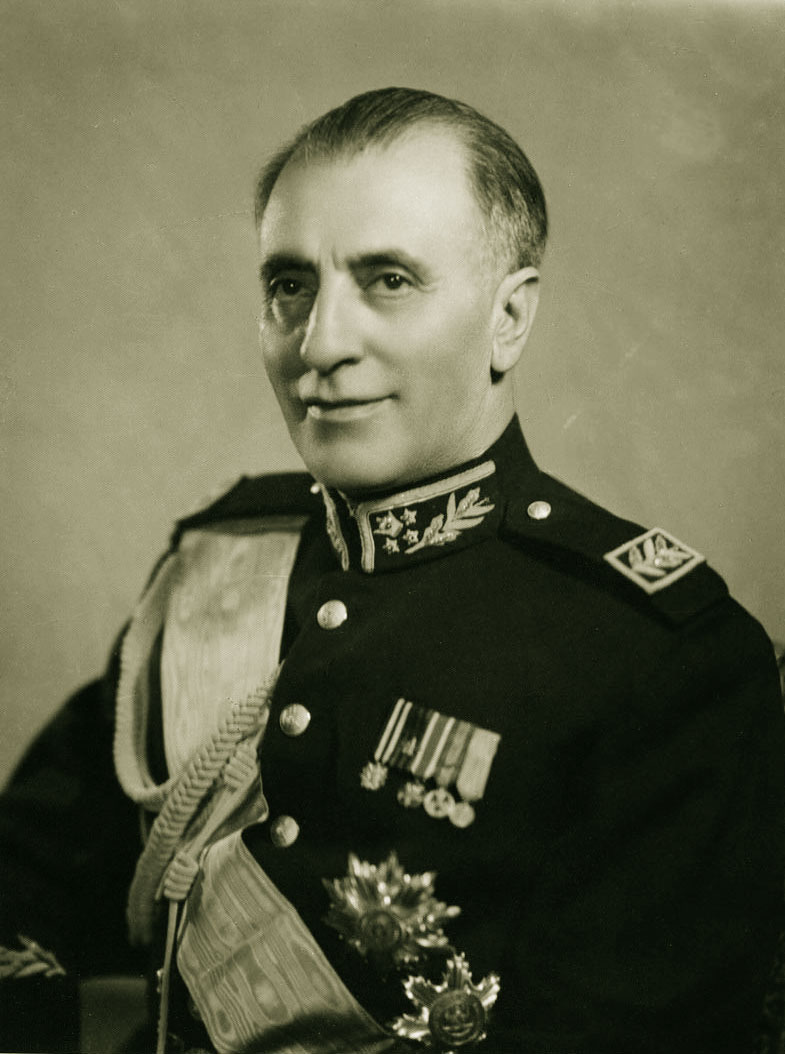
Fazlollah Zahedi

While the broad outlines of the operation are known, "...the C.I.A.'s records were widely thought by historians to have the potential to add depth and clarity to a famous but little-documented intelligence operation", reporter Tim Weiner wrote in The New York Times 29 May 1997.

"The Central Intelligence Agency, which has repeatedly pledged for more than five years to make public the files from its secret mission to overthrow the government of Iran in 1953, said today that it had destroyed or lost almost all the documents decades ago."

Donald Wilber, one of the CIA officers who planned the 1953 coup in Iran, wrote an account titled, Clandestine Service History Overthrow of Premier Mossadeq of Iran: November 1952 – August 1953. Wilber said one goal of the coup was to strengthen the Shah. In 2000, James Risen at The New York Times obtained the previously secret CIA version of the coup written by Wilber and summarized its contents, which includes the following:

In early August, the CIA increased the pressure. Iranian operatives pretending to be Communists threatened Muslim leaders with "savage punishment if they opposed Mosaddegh", seeking to stir anti-Communist sentiment in the religious community.

In addition, the secret history says, the house of at least one prominent Muslim was bombed by CIA agents posing as Communists. It does not say whether anyone was hurt in this attack.

The agency was intensifying its propaganda campaign. A leading newspaper owner was granted a personal loan of about $45,000, "in the belief that this would make his organ amenable to our purposes."

The Shah remained intransigent. In a 1 August meeting with General Schwarzkopf, he refused to sign the C.I.A.-written decrees firing Mr. Mosaddegh and appointing General Zahedi. He said he doubted that the army would support him in a showdown.

The National Security Archive at George Washington University contains the full account by Wilber, along with many other coup-related documents and analysis.

=== Release of U.S. government records and official acknowledgement ===
In August 2013, on the 60th anniversary of the coup, the US government released documents showing they were involved in staging the coup. The documents also describe the motivations behind the coup and the strategies used to stage it. The UK had sought to censor information regarding its role in the coup; a significant number of documents about the coup remained classified. The release of the declassified documents, which marked the first US official acknowledgement of its role, was seen as a goodwill gesture on the part of the Obama administration. According to Aljazeera, the deputy director of the National Security Archive, Malcolm Byrne, disclosed that the CIA documented the secret histories purposely for official use.

Public awareness of American and British participation in Mosaddeq's overthrow was long-standing. An internal narrative from the middle of the 1970s called "The Battle for Iran" makes a clear reference to the CIA's involvement. In 1981, the agency made a highly edited version of the report public in reaction to an ACLU lawsuit, but it blocked out all mentions of TPAJAX, the code name for the American-led operation. These references can be found in the most recent release in 2013, which is thought to be the CIA's first official admission that the agency assisted in the coup's planning and execution.

In June 2017, the United States State Department's Office of the Historian released its revised historical account of the event. The volume of historical records "focuses on the evolution of U.S. thinking on Iran as well as the U.S. Government covert operation that resulted in Mosadeq's overthrow on 19 August 1953". Though some of the relevant records were destroyed long ago, the release contains a collection of roughly 1,000 pages, only a small number of which remain classified. One revelation is that the CIA "attempted to call off the failing coup but was salvaged by an insubordinate spy." The reports released by the U.S. had reached 1,007 pages, consisting of diplomatic cables and letters according to VOA News.

In March 2018, the National Security Archive released a declassified British memo alleging that the United States Embassy sent "large sums of money" to "influential people"—namely senior Iranian clerics—in the days leading up to Mosaddeq's overthrow. According to the Guardian, despite the U.S. showing regrets about the coup, it has failed to officially issue an apology over its involvement.

=== United States financial support ===
The CIA paid a large sum to carry out the operation. Depending on the expenses to be counted, the final cost is estimated to vary from $100,000 to $20 million. CIA gave Zahedi's government $5 million after the coup,with Zahedi himself receiving an extra million.

=== United States motives ===
Historians disagree on what motivated the United States to change its policy towards Iran and stage the coup. Middle East historian Ervand Abrahamian identified the coup d'état as "a classic case of nationalism clashing with imperialism in the Third World". He states that Secretary of State Dean Acheson admitted the "'Communist threat' was a smokescreen" in responding to President Eisenhower's claim that the Tudeh Party was about to assume power:

Throughout the crisis, the "communist danger" was more of a rhetorical device than a real issue—i.e. it was part of the cold-war discourse ...The Tudeh was no match for the armed tribes and the 129,000-man military. What is more, the British and Americans had enough inside information to be confident that the party had no plans to initiate armed insurrection. At the beginning of the crisis, when the Truman administration was under the impression a compromise was possible, Acheson had stressed the communist danger, and warned if Mosaddegh was not helped, the Tudeh would take over. The (British) Foreign Office had retorted that the Tudeh was no real threat. But, in August 1953, when the Foreign Office echoed the Eisenhower administration's claim that the Tudeh was about to take over, Acheson now retorted that there was no such communist danger. Acheson was honest enough to admit that the issue of the Tudeh was a smokescreen.

Abrahamian states that Iran's oil was the central focus of the coup, for both the British and the Americans, though "much of the discourse at the time linked it to the Cold War". Abrahamian wrote, "If Mosaddegh had succeeded in nationalizing the British oil industry in Iran, that would have set an example and was seen at that time by the Americans as a threat to U.S. oil interests throughout the world, because other countries would do the same." Mosaddegh did not want any compromise solution that allowed a degree of foreign control. Abrahamian said that Mosaddegh "wanted real nationalization, both in theory and practice".

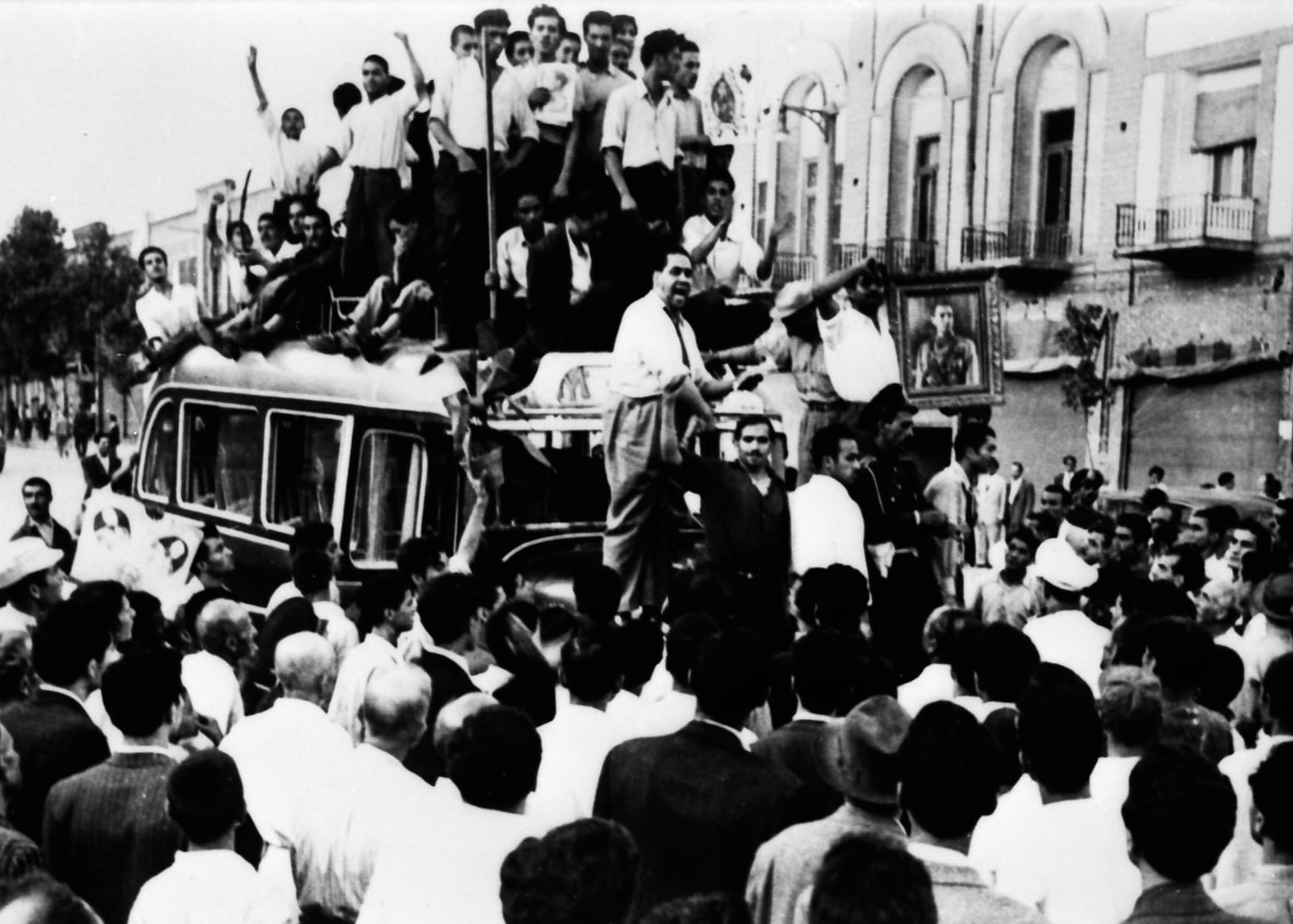
Pro-shah sympathizers

Political theorist John Tirman points out that agricultural land owners were politically dominant in Iran well into the 1960s, and the monarch Reza Shah's aggressive land expropriation policies—to the benefit of himself and his supporters—resulted in the Iranian government being Iran's largest land owner. "The landlords and oil producers had new backing, moreover, as American interests were for the first time exerted in Iran. The Cold War was starting, and Soviet challenges were seen in every leftist movement. But the reformers were at root nationalists, not communists, and the issue that galvanized them above all others was the control of oil." The belief that oil was the central motivator behind the coup has been echoed in the popular media by authors such as Robert Byrd, Alan Greenspan, and Ted Koppel.

Middle East political scientist Mark J. Gasiorowski states that while, on the face of it, there is considerable merit to the argument that U.S. policymakers helped U.S. oil companies gain a share in Iranian oil production after the coup, "it seems more plausible to argue that U.S. policymakers were motivated mainly by fears of a communist takeover in Iran, and that the involvement of U.S. companies was sought mainly to prevent this from occurring. The Cold War was at its height in the early 1950s, and the Soviet Union was viewed as an expansionist power seeking world domination. Eisenhower had made the Soviet threat a key issue in the 1952 elections, accusing the Democrats of being soft on communism and of having 'lost China.' Once in power, the new administration quickly sought to put its views into practice."

A 2019 study by Gasiorowski concluded "that U.S. policymakers did not have compelling evidence that the threat of a Communist takeover was increasing substantially in the months before the coup. Rather, the Eisenhower administration interpreted the available evidence in a more alarming manner than the Truman administration had."

Gasiorowski further states "the major U.S. oil companies were not interested in Iran at this time. A glut existed in the world oil market. The U.S. majors had increased their production in Saudi Arabia and Kuwait in 1951 in order to make up for the loss of Iranian production; operating in Iran would force them to cut back production in these countries which would create tensions with Saudi and Kuwaiti leaders. Furthermore, if nationalist sentiments remained high in Iran, production there would be risky. U.S. oil companies had shown no interest in Iran in 1951 and 1952. By late 1952, the Truman administration had come to believe that participation by U.S. companies in the production of Iranian oil was essential to maintain stability in Iran and keep Iran out of Soviet hands. In order to gain the participation of the major U.S. oil companies, Truman offered to scale back a large anti-trust case then being brought against them. The Eisenhower administration shared Truman's views on the participation of U.S. companies in Iran and also agreed to scale back the anti-trust case. Thus, not only did U.S. majors not want to participate in Iran at this time, it took a major effort by U.S. policymakers to persuade them to become involved."

In 2004, Gasiorowski edited a book on the coup arguing that "the climate of intense cold war rivalry between the superpowers, together with Iran's strategic vital location between the Soviet Union and the Persian Gulf oil fields, led U.S. officials to believe that they had to take whatever steps were necessary to prevent Iran from falling into Soviet hands." While "these concerns seem vastly overblown today" the pattern of "the 1945–46 Azerbaijan crisis, the consolidation of Soviet control in Eastern Europe, the communist triumph in China, and the Korean War—and with the Red Scare at its height in the United States" would not allow U.S. officials to risk allowing the Tudeh Party to gain power in Iran. Furthermore, "U.S. officials believed that resolving the oil dispute was essential for restoring stability in Iran, and after March 1953 it appeared that the dispute could be resolved only at the expense either of Britain or of Mosaddeq." He concludes "it was geostrategic considerations, rather than a desire to destroy Mosaddeq's movement, to establish a dictatorship in Iran or to gain control over Iran's oil, that persuaded U.S. officials to undertake the coup." Faced with choosing between British interests and Iran, the U.S. chose Britain, Gasiorowski said. "Britain was the closest ally of the United States, and the two countries were working as partners on a wide range of vitally important matters throughout the world at this time. Preserving this close relationship was more important to U.S. officials than saving Mosaddeq's tottering regime." A year earlier, British Prime Minister Winston Churchill used Britain's support for the U.S. in the Cold War to insist the United States not undermine his campaign to isolate Mosaddegh. "Britain was supporting the Americans in Korea, he reminded Truman, and had a right to expect 'Anglo-American unity' on Iran."

According to Kinzer, for most Americans, the crisis in Iran became just part of the conflict between Communism and "the Free world". "A great sense of fear, particularly the fear of encirclement, shaped American consciousness during this period. ... Soviet power had already subdued Latvia, Lithuania, and Estonia. Communist governments were imposed on Bulgaria and Romania in 1946, Hungary and Poland in 1947, and Czechoslovakia in 1948. Albania and Yugoslavia also turned to communism. Greek communists made a violent bid for power. Soviet soldiers blocked land routes to Berlin for sixteen months. In 1949, the Soviet Union successfully tested a nuclear weapon. That same year, pro-Western forces in China lost their Civil War to communists led by Mao Zedong. From Washington, it seemed that enemies were on the march everywhere." Consequently, "the United States, challenged by what most Americans saw as a relentless communist advance, slowly ceased to view Iran as a country with a unique history that faced a unique political challenge." Some historians, including Douglas Little, Abbas Milani and George Lenczowski have echoed the view that fears of a communist takeover or Soviet influence motivated the U.S. to intervene.

On 11 May 1951, prior to the overthrow of Mosaddegh, Adolf A. Berle warned the U.S. State Department that U.S. "control of the Middle East was at stake, which, with its Persian Gulf oil, meant 'substantial control of the world.'"

=== News coverage in the United States and the United Kingdom ===
When Mosaddegh called for the dissolution of the Majlis in August 1953, the editors of the New York Times gave the opinion that: "A plebiscite more fantastic and farcical than any ever held under Hitler or Stalin is now being staged in Iran by Premier Mosaddegh in an effort to make himself unchallenged dictator of the country."

A year after the coup, the New York Times wrote on 6 August 1954, that a new oil "agreement between Iran and a consortium of foreign oil companies" was "good news indeed":

Costly as the dispute over Iranian oil has been to all concerned, the affair may yet be proved worthwhile if lessons are learned from it: Underdeveloped countries with rich resources now have an object lesson in the heavy cost that must be paid by one of their number which goes berserk with fanatical nationalism. It is perhaps too much to hope that Iran's experience will prevent the rise of Mosaddeghs in other countries, but that experience may at least strengthen the hands of more reasonable and more far-seeing leaders. In some circles in Great Britain the charge will be pushed that American "imperialism"—in the shape of the American oil firms in the consortium!—has once again elbowed Britain from a historic stronghold.

The documentary Cinematograph aired on 18 August 2011 on the anniversary of the coup. In it, BBC admitted for the first time to the role of BBC Persian radio as the propaganda arm of the British government in Iran. The Cinematograph narrator said:

The British government used the BBC Persian radio for advancing its propaganda against Mosaddegh and anti-Mosaddegh material were repeatedly aired on the radio channel to the extent that Iranian staff at the BBC Persian radio went on strike to protest the move.

The documentary quoted a 21 July 1951 classified document in which a Foreign Office official thanked the British ambassador for his proposals that were precisely followed by the BBC Persian radio to strengthen its propaganda against Mosaddegh:

The BBC had already made most of the points which you listed, but they were very glad to have an indication from you of what was likely to be most effective and will arrange their programme accordingly... We should also avoid direct attacks on the 'ruling classes' since it seems probable that we may want to deal with a government drawn from those classes should Mosaddegh fall.

The BBC was at times even used directly in the operations, sending coded messages to the coup plotters by changing the wording of its broadcasts.

An early account of the CIA's role in the coup appeared in The Saturday Evening Post in late 1954, purporting to explain how "the strategic little nation of Iran was rescued from the closing clutch of Moscow." The report was approved by the CIA, and its authors may have been assisted by Kermit Roosevelt Jr., who had written for the Post before.

== Britain's role ==
The National Security Archive released two declassified documents in August 2017 which confirm the British solicitation of the United States' assistance in ousting Mosaddegh. According to these records, the British first approached the American government about a plan for the coup in November 1952 "repeatedly" asking U.S. to join the coup, claiming that the Mosaddegh government would be ineffective in preventing a communist takeover, and that Mosaddegh was a threat to America's global fight against communism, which they believed necessitated action; the records also state that UK and U.S. spy agencies had by then had "very tentative and preliminary discussions regarding the practicability of such a move". At the time, the American government was already preparing to aid Mosaddegh in his oil dealings with the British, and believed him to be anti-communist—considerations which made the U.S. government skeptical of the plot. Since President Truman's term was drawing to a close in January 1953, and there was too much uncertainty and danger associated with the plot, the U.S. government decided not to take action against Mosaddegh.

According to the 1952 documents, it was Christopher Steel, the No 2 official in the British embassy in Washington, who "pitched" the idea of the coup to US officials amid the US-Britain talks which had begun in October. The document also says that the British officials rejected Paul Nitze's suggestion that, instead of executing a coup, they mount a "campaign" against Ayatollah Abolqasem Kashani, "a leading opponent of British involvement in Iran's oil industry", and the communist Tudeh Party. They "pressed the US for a decision" since they knew "the Truman administration was in its final weeks". According to Wilber, the British Secret Intelligence Service launched a propaganda campaign via "the press, handbills and the Tehran clergy" to "weaken the Mossadeq government in any way possible".

More broadly, the oil nationalization law led to a direct conflict of interests between Mosaddegh and the British government, and the latter proposed to regain its control over the oil industry in Iran by following a "three-track strategy" aimed at either "pressuring him into a favorable settlement or by removing him from the office." The three components of Britain's strategy consisted of (1) refusing direct negotiation with Mosaddegh, (2) imposing economic sanctions on Iran and performing war games in the region, and (3) the removal of Mosaddegh through "covert political action".

In the lead-up to the 70th anniversary of the coup in August 2023, David Owen, who was the UK Foreign Secretary in the late 1970s, said that MI6 should follow the example of the CIA and acknowledge its role in the coup.

== Clergy's role ==
Mosaddegh appointed a series of secular ministers to his cabinet during his premiership, losing his support with the clergy. In 1953, Ayatollah Abol-Qasem Kashani and his followers organised a series of protests against Mosaddegh's liberal reforms. By July 1953 when Mosaddegh asked for a critical extension of his emergency powers, "... Clerical members of the Majlis who supported Kashani left the National Front Coalition and set up their own Islamic Faction...". (Muslim Warriors). This faction then boycotted the 1953 referendum about the dissolution of parliament.

At 8am on 18 August Ayatollah Behbahani mobilised 3000 stick and club wielding anti-shah protestors formed a mob in Tehran. This was done in the hope that the removal of Mosaddegh would create a more religious government. Separate mobilisation was instigated by Ayatollah Kashani in the country at this time. There has been documentation that both Ayatollah Behbahani and Kashani received funds from the CIA by some sources. The former's mob would lead Mosaddegh to abandon his residence, and ultimately his capture. Iranian Historian Michael Axworthy stated that "... [The clergy's] move to oppose Mossadeq was the decisive factor in his downfall...".

== Aftermath ==
The coup has been said to have "left a profound and long-lasting legacy."

=== Blowback ===
The coup caused long-lasting damage to the reputation of the United States, according to documents released to the National Security Archive and reflected in the book Mohammad Mosaddeq and the 1953 Coup in Iran:

The '28 Mordad' coup, as it is known by its Persian date [in the Solar Hijri calendar], was a watershed for Iran, for the Middle East and for the standing of the United States in the region. The joint US-British operation ended Iran's drive to assert sovereign control over its own resources and helped put an end to a vibrant chapter in the history of the country's nationalist and democratic movements. These consequences resonated with dramatic effect in later years. When the Shah finally fell in 1979, memories of the US intervention in 1953, which made possible the monarch's subsequent, and increasingly unpopular, 25-year reign intensified the anti-American character of the revolution in the minds of many Iranians.

The authoritarian monarch appreciated the coup, Kermit Roosevelt wrote in his account of the affair. "'I owe my throne to God, my people, my army and to you!' By 'you' he [the shah] meant me and the two countries—Great Britain and the United States—I was representing. We were all heroes."

On 16 June 2000, The New York Times published the secret CIA report, "Clandestine Service History, Overthrow of Premier Mossadeq of Iran, November 1952 – August 1953", partly explaining the coup from CIA agent Wilber's perspective. In a related story, The New York Times reporter James Risen penned a story revealing that Wilber's report, hidden for nearly five decades, had recently come to light.

In the summer of 2001, Ervand Abrahamian writes in the journal Science & Society that Wilber's version of the coup was missing key information some of which was available elsewhere:

The New York Times recently leaked a CIA report on the 1953 American-British overthrow of Mosaddeq, Iran's Prime Minister. It billed the report as a secret history of the secret coup, and treated it as an invaluable substitute for the U.S. files that remain inaccessible. But a reconstruction of the coup from other sources, especially from the archives of the British Foreign Office, indicates that this report is highly sanitized. It glosses over such sensitive issues as the crucial participation of the U.S. ambassador in the actual overthrow; the role of U.S. military advisers; the harnessing of local Nazis and Muslim terrorists; and the use of assassinations to destabilize the government. What is more, it places the coup in the context of the Cold War rather than that of the Anglo-Iranian oil crisis—a classic case of nationalism clashing with imperialism in the Third World.

In a review of Tim Weiner's Legacy of Ashes, historian Michael Beschloss wrote, "Mr. Weiner argues that a bad C.I.A. track record has encouraged many of our gravest contemporary problems... A generation of Iranians grew up knowing that the C.I.A. had installed the shah", Mr. Weiner notes. "In time, the chaos that the agency had created in the streets of Tehran would return to haunt the United States."

The administration of Dwight D. Eisenhower considered the coup a success, but, given its blowback, that opinion is no longer generally held, because of its "haunting and terrible legacy". In 2000, Madeleine Albright, U.S. Secretary of State, said that intervention by the U.S. in the internal affairs of Iran was a setback for democratic government. The coup is widely believed to have significantly contributed to the 1979 Iranian Revolution, which deposed the "pro-Western" Shah and replaced the monarchy with an "anti-Western" Islamic republic.

- According to U.S. President Obama. "For many Iranians, the coup demonstrated duplicity by the United States, which presented itself as a defender of freedom but did not hesitate to use underhanded methods to overthrow a democratically elected government to suit its own economic and strategic interests", the Agence France-Presse reported.

United States Supreme Court Justice William O. Douglas, who visited Iran both before and after the coup, wrote that "When Mosaddegh and Persia started basic reforms, we became alarmed. We united with the British to destroy him; we succeeded; and ever since, our name has not been an honored one in the Middle East."

=== Iran ===
==== Perceptions of the Shah ====
When the Shah returned to Iran after the coup, he was greeted by a cheering crowd. He wrote in his memoirs that while he had been a king for over a decade, for the first time he felt that the people had "elected" and "approved" of him, and that he had a "legitimate" popular mandate to carry out his reforms (although some in the crowd may have been bribed). The Shah was never able to remove the reputation of being a "foreign imposed" ruler among non-royalist Iranians. The Shah throughout his rule continued to assume that he was supported by virtually everybody in Iran, and sank into deep dejection when in 1978 massive mobs demanded his ouster.

==== Bloody suppression of the opposition ====
An immediate consequence of the coup d'état was the Shah's suppression of all republicanist political dissent, especially the liberal and nationalist opposition umbrella group National Front as well as the communist Tudeh Party, and concentration of political power in the Shah and his courtiers.

The minister of Foreign Affairs and the closest associate of Mosaddegh, Hossein Fatemi, was executed by order of the Shah's military court by firing squad on 10 November 1954. According to Kinzer, "The triumphant Shah [Pahlavi] ordered the execution of several dozen military officers and student leaders who had been closely associated with Mohammad Mosaddegh".

As part of the post-coup d'état political repression between 1953 and 1958, the Shah outlawed the National Front, and arrested most of its leaders. The Shah personally spared Mosaddegh the death penalty, and he was given 3 years in prison, followed by house arrest for life.

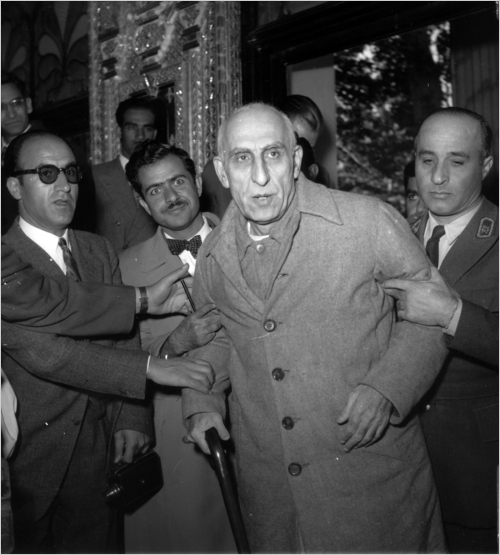
Mohammad Mosaddegh in court, 8 November 1953

Many supporters of Iran continued to fight against the new regime, yet they were suppressed with some even being killed. The political party that Mosaddegh founded, the National Front of Iran, was later reorganized by Karim Sanjabi, and was later led by the National poet of Iran Adib Boroumand, who was a strong Mosaddegh supporter and helped spread pro-Mosaddegh propaganda during the Abadan Crisis and its aftermath.

The Communist Tudeh bore the main brunt of the crackdown. The Shah's security forces arrested 4,121 Tudeh political activists including 386 civil servants, 201 college students, 165 teachers, 125 skilled workers, 80 textile workers, and 60 cobblers. Forty were executed (primarily for murder, such as Khosro Roozbeh), another 14 died under torture and over 200 were sentenced to life imprisonment. The Shah's post-coup dragnet also captured 477 Tudeh members ("22 colonels, 69 majors, 100 captains, 193 lieutenants, 19 noncommissioned officers, and 63 military cadets") who were in the Iranian armed forces. After their presence was revealed, some National Front supporters complained that this Communist Tudeh military network could have saved Mosaddegh. However, few Tudeh officers commanded powerful field units, especially tank divisions that might have countered the coup. Most of the captured Tudeh officers came from the military academies, police and medical corps. At least eleven of the captured army officers were tortured to death between 1953 and 1958.

==== Creation of a secret police ====
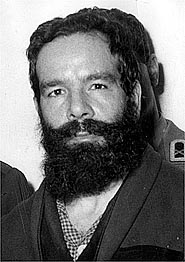
Hossein Fatemi after arrest

After the 1953 coup, the Shah's government formed the SAVAK (secret police), many of whose agents were trained in the United States. The SAVAK monitored dissidents and carried out censorship. After the 1971 Siahkal Incident, it was given a "loose leash" to torture suspected dissidents with "brute force" that, over the years, "increased dramatically", and nearly 100 people were executed for political reasons during the last 20 years of the Shah's rule. After the revolution, SAVAK was officially abolished, but was in reality "drastically expanded" into a new organization that killed over 8,000–12,000 prisoners between 1981 and 1985 alone, and 20,000–30,000 in total, with one prisoner who served time under both the Shah and the Islamic Republic declaring that "four months under (Islamic Republic's) warden Asadollah Lajevardi took the toll of four years under SAVAK".

==== Oil policy ====
Another effect was sharp improvement of Iran's economy; the British-led oil embargo against Iran ended, and oil revenue increased significantly beyond the pre-nationalisation level. Despite Iran not controlling its national oil, the Shah agreed to replacing the Anglo-Iranian Oil Company with a consortium—British Petroleum and eight European and American oil companies; in result, oil revenues increased from $34 million in 1954–1955 to $181 million in 1956–1957, and continued increasing, and the United States sent development aid and advisers. The Shah's government attempted to solve the issue of oil nationalization through this method, and Iran began to develop rapidly under his rule. The Shah later in his memoirs declared that Mosaddegh was a "dictator" who was "damaging" Iran through his "stubbornness", while he (the Shah) "followed" the smarter option. By the 1970s, Iran was wealthier than all of its surrounding neighbors, and economists frequently predicted that it would become a major global economic power, and a developed country.

When the Shah attempted during the 1970s to once again control the oil prices (through OPEC), and cancel the same oil consortium agreement that caused the 1953 coup, it resulted in a massive decline in US support for the Shah, and ironically, hastened his downfall.

CIA staff historian David Robarge stated: "The CIA carried out [a] successful regime change operation. It also transformed a turbulent constitutional monarchy into an absolutist kingship and induced a succession of unintended consequences." The 1979 Iranian Revolution was a most impactful unintended consequence.

=== Internationally ===
Kinzer wrote that the 1953 coup d'état was the first time the United States used the CIA to overthrow a "democratically elected", "civil government". The Eisenhower administration viewed Operation Ajax as a success, with "immediate and far-reaching effect. Overnight, the CIA became a central part of the American foreign policy apparatus, and covert action came to be regarded as a cheap and effective way to shape the course of world events"—a coup engineered by the CIA called Operation PBSuccess toppling the duly elected Guatemalan government of Jacobo Árbenz Guzmán, which had nationalised farm land owned by the United Fruit Company, followed the next year.

A pro-American government in Iran extended the United States' geographic and strategic advantage in the Middle East, as Turkey, also bordering the USSR, was part of NATO.

In 2000, U.S. Secretary of State Madeleine K. Albright, acknowledged the coup's pivotal role in the troubled relationship and "came closer to apologizing than any American official ever has before":

The Eisenhower administration believed its actions were justified for strategic reasons. ... But the coup was clearly a setback for Iran's political development. And it is easy to see now why many Iranians continue to resent this intervention by America in their internal affairs.

In June 2009, the U.S. President Barack Obama in a speech in Cairo, Egypt, talked about the United States' relationship with Iran, mentioning the role of the U.S. in 1953 Iranian coup saying:

This issue has been a source of tension between the United States and the Islamic Republic of Iran. For many years, Iran has defined itself in part by its opposition to my country, and there is indeed a tumultuous history between us. In the middle of the Cold War, the United States played a role in the overthrow of a democratically elected Iranian government. Since the Islamic Revolution, Iran has played a role in acts of hostage-taking and violence against U.S. troops and civilians. This history is well known. Rather than remain trapped in the past, I have made it clear to Iran's leaders and people that my country is prepared to move forward.

== Legacy ==
In the Islamic Republic, remembrance of the coup is quite different from that of history books published in the West, and follows the precepts of Ayatollah Khomeini that Islamic jurists must guide the country to prevent "the influence of foreign powers". Kashani came out against Mosaddegh by mid-1953 and "told a foreign correspondent that Mosaddegh had fallen because he had forgotten that the shah enjoyed extensive popular support." A month later, Kashani "went even further and declared that Mosaddegh deserved to be executed because he had committed the ultimate offense: rebelling against the shah, 'betraying' the country, and repeatedly violating the sacred law." The role of the clergy has also been reinterpreted by the Islamic Republic. After the revolution, the regime emphasized Kashani as an important anti-imperialist predecessor of Ayatollah Khomeini, while giving comparatively little attention to Mosaddegh. Khomeini frequently praised Kashani but rarely discussed Mosaddegh. This selective historical interpretation allowed the Islamic Republic to claim the legacy of the anti-imperialist struggle while avoiding the uncomfortable fact that one of its most prominent nationalist figures was also a committed secularist.

Men associated with Mosaddegh and his ideals dominated Iran's first post-revolutionary government. The first prime minister after the Iranian revolution was Mehdi Bazargan, a close associate of Mosaddegh. But with the subsequent rift between the conservative Islamic establishment and the secular liberal forces, Mosaddegh's work and legacy has been largely ignored by the Islamic Republic establishment. However, Mosaddegh remains a popular historical figure among Iranian opposition factions. Mosaddegh's image is one of the symbols of Iran's opposition movement, also known as the Green Movement. Kinzer writes that Mosaddegh "for most Iranians" is "the most vivid symbol of Iran's long struggle for democracy" and that modern protesters carrying a picture of Mosaddegh is the equivalent of saying "We want democracy" and "No foreign intervention".

External videos
- Presentation by Kinzer on All the Shah's Men, 8 October 2003, C-SPAN

In the Islamic Republic of Iran, Kinzer's book All the Shah's Men: An American Coup and the Roots of Middle East Terror has been censored of descriptions of Ayatollah Abol-Ghasem Kashani's activities during the Anglo-American coup d'état. Mahmoud Kashani, the son of Abol-Ghasem Kashani, "one of the top members of the current, ruling élite" whom the Iranian Council of Guardians has twice approved to run for the presidency, denies there was a coup d'état in 1953, saying Mosaddegh was obeying British plans to undermine the role of Shia clerics.

This allegation also is posited in the book Khaterat-e Arteshbod-e Baznesheshteh Hossein Fardoust (The Memoirs of Retired General Hossein Fardoust), published in the Islamic Republic and allegedly written by Hossein Fardoust, a former SAVAK officer. It says that rather than being a mortal enemy of the British, Mohammad Mosaddegh always favored them, and his nationalisation campaign of the Anglo-Iranian Oil Company was inspired by "the British themselves". Scholar Ervand Abrahamian suggests that the fact that Fardoust's death was announced before publication of the book may be significant, as the Islamic Republic authorities may have forced him into writing such statements under duress.

== Viewpoints ==
Ruhollah Khomeini said the government did not pay enough attention to religious figures which caused the coup d'état to take place and described the separation between religion and politics as a fault in contemporary history.

Ali Khamenei believed that Mosaddegh trusted the United States and asked them to help confront Britain.

== In popular culture ==
Directed by Hasan Fathi and written jointly with playwright and university professor Naghmeh Samini, the TV series Shahrzad is the story of a love broken apart by events in the aftermath of the 1953 coup that overthrew the democratically elected prime minister, Mohammad Mosaddegh.

Cognito Comics/Verso Books has published a nonfiction graphic novel of the history, Operation AJAX: The Story of the CIA Coup That Remade The Middle East, that covers events leading to how the CIA hired rival mobs to create chaos and overthrow the country.

== See also ==
- Muhammad Kazim Khurasani
- Mirza Husayn Tehrani
- Abdallah Mazandarani
- Mirza Ali Aqa Tabrizi
- Mirza Sayyed Mohammad Tabatabai
- Seyyed Abdollah Behbahani
- Islamic fundamentalism in Iran
- 1957 alleged Jordanian military coup attempt
- 1981 Bahraini coup attempt
- CIA activities in Iran
- List of modern conflicts in the Middle East
- Special Activities Center
- United States involvement in regime change
- Coup 53 documentary by Taghi Amirani
- 1979 Iranian Revolution conspiracy theory
- 1954 Guatemalan coup d'état

== Bibliography ==
- Abrahamian, Ervand (1982). Iran Between Two Revolutions. Princeton University Press. ISBN 978-0-69110134-7.
- ——— (2013). The Coup: 1953, the CIA, and the roots of modern U.S.-Iranian relations. New York: The New Press. ISBN 978-1-59558-826-5.
- Dorril, Stephen, Mi6: Inside the Covert World of Her Majesty's Secret Intelligence Service ISBN 978-0-7432-0379-1 (paperback is separately titled: MI6: Fifty Years of Special Operations Fourth Estate: London, a division of HarperCollins ISBN 1-85702-701-9)
- Dreyfuss, Robert (2005). Devil's Game: How the United States Helped Unleash Fundamentalist Islam. Henry Holt & Co. ISBN 978-0-80507652-3.
- Elm, Mostafa. Oil, Power and Principle: Iran's Oil Nationalization and Its Aftermath. (Syracuse University Press, 1994) ISBN 978-0-8156-2642-8 Documents competition between Britain and the United States for Iranian oil, both before and after the coup. Publishers Weekly summary: "an impressive work of scholarship by an Iranian economist and former diplomat [showing how] the CIA-orchestrated coup, followed by U.S. backing of the dictatorial Shah, planted"
- Elwell-Sutton, L. P. 1955 Persian Oil: A Study in Power Politics, Lawrence & Wishart: London. Reprinted by Greenwood Press 1976. ISBN 978-0-8371-7122-7
- Farmanfarmaiyan, Manuchihr, Roxane Farmanfarmaian Blood and Oil: A Prince's Memoir of Iran, from the Shah to the Ayatollah (Random House 2005). A cousin of Mosaddeq, Farmanfarmaiyan was the Shah's oil adviser. Sympathetic to the Shah and antagonistic to Khomeini, Farmanfarmaiyan offers many insider details of the epic battle for Iranian oil, both in Iran's historic relationship with Britain and then, after the coup, with the United States. ISBN 978-0-81297508-6
- Gasiorowski, Mark J. U.S. Foreign Policy and the Shah: Building a Client State in Iran (Cornell University Press: 1991). Traces the exact changes in U.S. foreign policy that led to the coup in Iran soon after the inauguration of Dwight D. Eisenhower; describes "the consequences of the coup for Iran's domestic politics" including "an extensive series of arrests and installation of a rigid authoritarian regime under which all forms of opposition political activity were prohibited." Documents how U.S. oil industry benefited from the coup with, for the first time, 40 percent post-coup share in Iran's oil revenue. ISBN 9780801424120
- ———; Malcolm Byrne, eds. (2004). Mohammad Mosaddeq and the 1953 Coup in Iran. Syracuse University Press. ISBN 978-0-8156-3018-0.
- ——— (August 1987). "The 1953 Coup D'état in Iran". International Journal of Middle East Studies. 10 (3): 261–86. doi:10.1017/S0020743800056737. JSTOR 163655. S2CID 154201459.
- Gendzier, Irene. Notes From the Minefield: United States Intervention in Lebanon and the Middle East, 1945–1958 Westview Press, 1999. ISBN 978-0-8133-6689-0
- Heiss, Mary Ann, Empire and Nationhood: The United States, Great Britain, and Iranian Oil, 1950–1954, Columbia University Press,1997. ISBN 0-231-10819-2
- Kapuscinski, Ryszard (1982). Shah of Shahs. Vintage. ISBN 978-0-679-73801-5.
- Kinzer, Stephen (2003). All the Shah's Men: An American Coup and the Roots of Middle East Terror. John Wiley & Sons. ISBN 978-0-471-26517-7.
- Kinzer, Stephen, Overthrow: America's Century of Regime Change from Hawaii to Iraq (Henry Holt & Co 2006). ISBN 978-0-8050-8240-1. Assesses the influence of John Foster Dulles on U.S. foreign policy. "Dulles was tragically mistaken in his view that the Kremlin lay behind the emergence of nationalism in the developing world. He could... claim consistency in his uncompromising opposition to every nationalist, leftist, or Marxist regime on earth."
- McCoy, Alfred (2006). A Question of Torture: CIA Interrogation, from the Cold War to the War on Terror. Metropolitan Books. ISBN 9780805080414.
- Rashid, Ahmed. Taliban: Militant Islam, Oil and Fundamentalism in Central Asia (Yale University Press 2010) ISBN 978-0-300-16368-1
- Roosevelt, Kermit Jr. (1979). Countercoup: The struggle for the control of Iran. McGraw-Hill. ISBN 978-0-07-053590-9.
- Weiner, Tim. Legacy of Ashes: The History of the CIA (Doubleday 2007) ISBN 978-0-307-38900-8
- Wilber "Clandestine Service History: Overthrow of Premier Mossadeq of Iran, Nov. 1952–1953" [CIA] CS Historical Paper no. 208. March 1954.
- Behrooz, Maziar (August 2001). "Tudeh Factionalism and the 1953 Coup in Iran". International Journal of Middle East Studies. 33 (3): 363–82. doi:10.1017/S0020743801003026. JSTOR 259456. S2CID 162990418.
- Wilford, Hugh (2013). America's Great Game: The CIA's Secret Arabists and the Making of the Modern Middle East. Basic Books. ISBN 978-0-465-01965-6.
