= Homa Sarshar =

Iranian-American activist and journalist

- هما سرشار
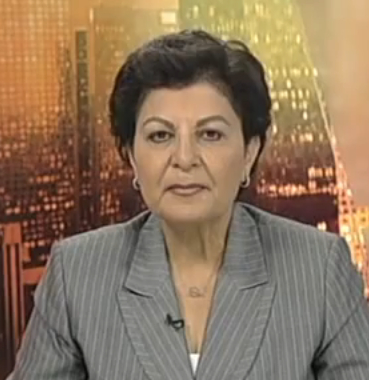
- Born: 1946 (age 79–80); Shiraz, Imperial State of Iran
- Education: University of Tehran (BA); University of Southern California (MA); American World University (PhD)
- Writing career
- Language: English, Persian
- Website: homasarshar.com

Homa Sarshar (Persian: هما سرشار; also Romanized as Homā Sarshār; born 1946) is an Iranian and American author, journalist, activist, and media personality. She was a columnist for Zan-e Rooz magazine and the Kayhan daily newspaper between 1964 and 1978.

== Early life ==
Homa Sarshar was born in 1946 in Shiraz, Imperial State of Iran (now Iran), to a Jewish family, and she was raised in Tehran. She studied French literature at Tehran University, and received a bachelor's degree in the subject. In 1978 she moved to the United States and settled in Los Angeles, California, before the Iranian Revolution.

She received a master's degree in journalism from the Annenberg School for Communication and Journalism at the University of Southern California; and a PhD from the distance learning American World University.

In 1993, Sarshar joined Human Rights Watch as an adviser.

== Awards and honors ==
Sarshar received the Ellis Island Medal of Honor in 2013. In Iran, the Iranian Women's Organization of Tehran presented Sarshar with a Medal for Special Achievement in Women's Rights.

She was awarded the 13th Bita Prize for Persian Arts in 2023 at Stanford University by the Bita Daryabari Endowment in Persian Letters.

== Bibliography ==
- Book of Now Ruz, Vol. 1 (1988)
- Book of Now Ruz, Vol. 2 (1989)
- Iranian Women's Image in Iranian Culture (ed.) (1993)
- Iranian Women, Researches and Arts (ed.) (1993)
- In the Back Alleys of Exile, 2 volumes (1993)
- Women and Family in Iran and Abroad (ed.) (1994)
- Women and Politics in Contemporary Iran (ed.) (1995)
- Women, Sexuality and Islam (ed.) (1996)
- Shaban Jafari, Naab Publishers (2002)
- Terua: The History of Contemporary Iranian Jews Vol I (1996), (ISBN 1883819121)
- The History of Contemporary Iranian Jews Vol II, Center for Iranian Jewish Oral History; Chap-i (1996), (ISBN 0966129105)
- The History of Contemporary Iranian Jews Vol III, Center for Iranian Jewish Oral History; Unabridged edition (1999), (ISBN 0966129113)
- The History of Contemporary Iranian Jews Vol IV, Center for Iranian Jewish Oral History; Unabridged edition (2000)

== See also ==
- List of Iranian women writers and poets
