= Shaban Jafari =

Iranian political activist (1921–2006)

Shaban Jafari شعبان جعفری
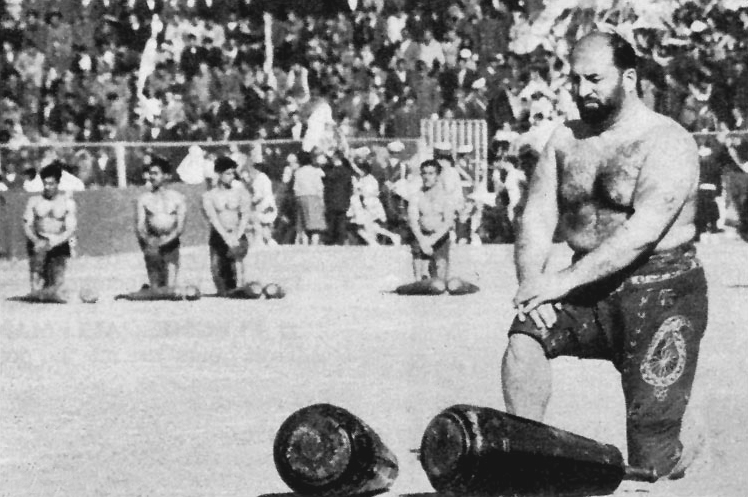
- Shaban Jafari during Pahlevani and zoorkhaneh rituals
- Born: 21 March 1921; Tehran, Sublime State of Iran
- Died: 19 August 2006 (aged 85); Santa Monica, California, United States
- Other names: Pahlevani Shaban; Shaban Pahlevan zoorkhaneh
- Occupations: Pahlevani and zoorkhaneh rituals, strongman, professional political strong arm

Shaban Jafari (Persian: شعبان جعفری; 21 March 1921 – 19 August 2006), also known as Pahlevan Shaban Jafari (Persian: پهلوان شعبان جعفری, romanized: Pahlaven Sha'bān Jafari) by Pahlavi supporters or Shaban the Crown-Bestower (Persian: شعبان تاجبخش, romanized: Sha'bān-e Tājbakhsh) or Shaban Bi-Mokh (Shaban the Maniac) by Pahlavi opponents, was an Iranian political activist and practitioner of Pahlevani and zoorkhaneh rituals. A controversial figure in Iranian politics, he was instrumental in overthrowing Prime Minister Mohammad Mosaddegh's government in the 1953 Iranian coup d'état.

Following the coup, Shah Mohammad Reza Pahlavi seized power and governed as a dictator. Over time, the Shah's regime lost both popular support and confidence. By the 1970s, longstanding grievances against the Shah resulted in the Iranian Revolution which deposed him. Jafari, whose connection to the 1953 coup made him a target for the new Iranian government, fled to the United States where he remained until his death in 2006.

== Biography ==
Shaban Jafari, often known as Pahlevan Shaban or Shaban the Crown-Bestower, was a political activist who often resorted to thuggish tactics to scare his opponents into submission. He was also a practitioner of Iranian traditional sport (varzesh-e bastani) and was a frequent at Zoorkhaneh. During the 1953 Iranian coup d'état, he was often regarded as a leader of street fights for the Shah and against the popular Mossadegh.

Jafari's critics claimed that he received money from the British and American intelligence agencies. He rebuffed these accusations and maintained that he was in prison during the coup and could not have participated in it.

Following the successful coup against Mossadegh the Shah implemented several mechanism to secure his regime, the most notable being the SAVAK which was a secret police that spied on Iranian citizens. The Iranian government committed multiple instances of human rights abuses during this time. It was these human rights abuses coupled with the Shah's efforts to modernize Iran that began his downfall.

Support of the Shah collapsed by the late 1970s and Iranians began public demonstrations against the Shah's regime. Initially the Shah was successful in repressing these measures largely using the SAVAK to prevent dissent. These measures proved ineffective by the end of 1978 and the Shah was no longer able to maintain his grasp on power and the Iranian revolution was underway.

In 1979, the Shah made a desperate escape from Iran on 16 January. With the Shah now out of the country, a new Islamic government led by Ruhollah Khomeini rose to power and began prosecuting individuals who had connections to the Shah. Jafari was identified as a criminal for his involvement in the coup that brought the Shah to power. Khomeini's provisional government attempted prosecute him. It was unable to locate Jafari as he fled Iran and relocated to the United States where he was given political asylum.

His later life was relatively calm, and he died in Santa Monica in 2006. He is buried in Westwood Memorial Park, Westwood, Los Angeles County, California, US. A book of his memoirs was published in the United States by the Iranian American journalist Homa Sarshar which became very popular among the migrant Iranians in other countries. It was especially popular to the Iranians who fled from the country, after the Islamic Revolution.
