= Douglas Little =

American historian

Douglas Little is an American historian specializing in American diplomatic history, twentieth century America, and United States relations with the Middle East. Currently, his research focuses on the U.S. response to radical Islam between the 1967 Six-Day War and the 1979 Iranian Revolution. He teaches at Clark University in Worcester, Massachusetts, where he was also the Dean of the College.

His published books include American Orientalism: The United States and the Middle East since 1945, and Malevolent Neutrality: The United States, Great Britain and the origins of the Spanish Civil War.

== See also ==
- Orientalism
- Spanish Civil War
