= Mark J. Gasiorowski =

American political scientist and academic

Mark J. Gasiorowski (born October 9, 1954) is a political scientist at Tulane University in New Orleans in the field of Middle East politics, Third World politics, and U.S. foreign policy.

He has served frequently as a consultant to the United States Department of State. In 2003, following the September 11 attacks, he testified before the 9/11 Commission. Journalist and academic Stephen Kinzer has called him "the most persistent" of "a small but dedicated group of scholars [who] have devoted considerable effort to uncovering the truth about events surrounding the 1953 coup" in Iran, an event so important (Kinzer believes) it "defined all of subsequent Iranian history and reshaped the world in ways that only now becoming clear."

== Education ==
Gasiorowski earned his B.A. in mathematics at the University of Chicago in 1976, his M.A. in political science at the University of North Carolina at Chapel Hill in 1980, and his Ph.D. in political science at the UNC in 1984.

== Career ==
Gasiorowski was on the faculty of the Department of Political Science at Louisiana State University for many years, as assistant professor (1984-1989), then associate professor (1989-1997), and then full professor (1997-2012). He directed LSU's International Studies Program from 2005 to 2008. He was a visiting professor at Tehran University in the Faculty of Law and Political Science in summer 1994, summer 1996, and winter 1998. He was a visiting fellow at the Middle East Centre of St. Antony's College, Oxford, from 2001-2002.

Gasiorowski joined the faculty of Tulane University in 2013 as a professor of political science.

== Works ==
=== Books ===
- Government and Politics of the Middle East and North Africa, Fifth Edition. Westview Press, 2007. Edited with David Long and Bernard Reich.
- Mohammad Mosaddeq and the 1953 Coup in Iran. Syracuse University Press, 2004. Edited with Malcolm Byrne.
- U.S. Foreign Policy and the Shah: Building a Client State in Iran. Cornell University Press, 1991.

=== Contributions ===
- Gasiorowski, Mark. 2008. “Government and Politics.” In A Country Study: Iran. Washington: U.S. Library of Congress.
- “The New Aggressiveness in Iran’s Foreign Policy,” Middle East Policy, Vol, 14, No, 2, Summer 2007, pp. 125–132.
- Gasiorowski, Mark, and Zaheer Poptani. 2006. “The Macroeconomic Consequences of Democratic Transition: Learning Processes in the Third and Fourth Waves of Democratization.” Studies in Comparative International Development 41(2): 33-61.
- “The Real Power in Tehran,” The Guardian (London), June 29, 2005.
