= Khalil Tahmasebi =

Shia extremist who assassinated Iranian Prime Minister Ali Razmara in 1951

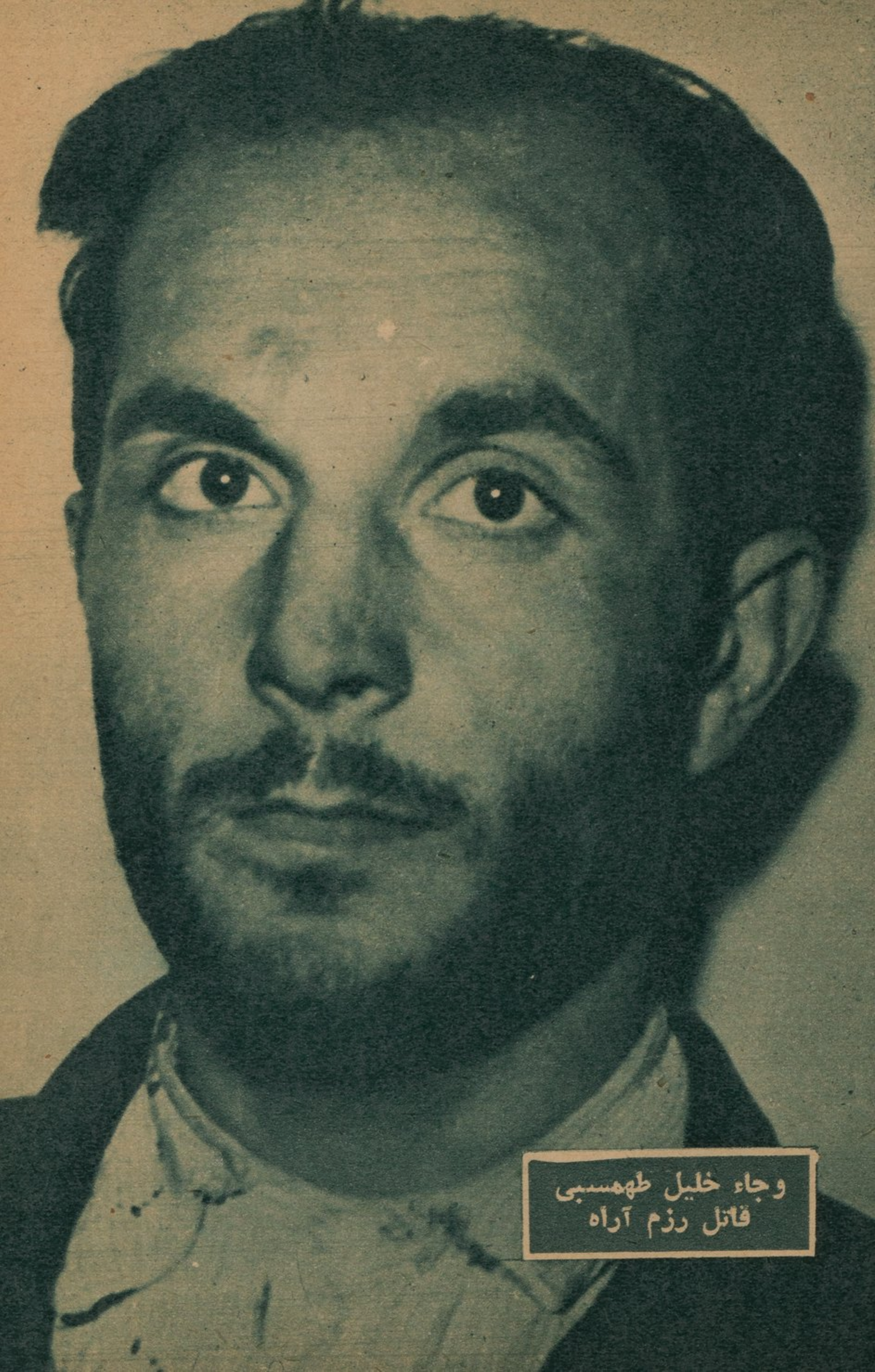
- Born: 14 February 1924; Sublime State of Persia
- Died: 18 January 1956 (aged 30); Imperial State of Iran
- Cause of death: Execution by firing squad
- Political party: Fada'iyan-e Islam

Khalil Tahmasebi (Persian: خلیل طهماسبی) (14 February 1924 – 18 January 1956) was a carpenter and member of the Iranian fundamentalist group Fadayan-e Islam ("Self-Sacrificers of Islam"), which has been described as "the first Shiite Islamist organization to employ terrorism as a primary method of political activism." On behalf of this group, Tahmasebi was waiting in the crowd on 7 March 1951 when Iranian Prime Minister Ali Razmara visited the Shah Mosque for a memorial service, and fired three shots, killing Razmara. He was arrested at the scene. He was described as a "religious fanatic" by The New York Times. In 1952, during the premiership of Mosaddegh, the Iranian Parliament quashed his pending death sentence, and he was declared a "Soldier of Islam." According to Time, Tahmasebi "promptly rushed to the Hazrat Abdolazim shrine, wept joyously and said: 'When I killed Razmara, I was sure that his people would kill me.'" Following the 1953 Iranian coup d'état, Tahmasebi was re-arrested and tried for the assassination of Razmara; he was executed in 1956.
