= Reuter concession =

1872 contract on concessions in Persia

The Reuter concession (Persian: امتیازنامه رویتر) was a contract signed in 1872 between Paul Reuter, a German-born British banker, businessman, and founder of Reuters, and Naser al-Din Shah Qajar, the Shah of Qajar Iran.

George Curzon wrote that:

[t]he concession was dated July 25, 1872. When published to the world, it was found to contain the most complete and extraordinary surrender of the entire industrial resources of a kingdom into foreign hands that has probably ever been dreamed of, much less accomplished, in history. Exclusive of the clauses referring to railroads and tramways, which conferred an absolute monopoly of both those undertakings upon Baron de Reuter for the space of seventy years, the concession also handed over to him the exclusive working for the same period of all Persian mines, except those of goldsilver, and precious stones; the monopoly of the government forests, all uncultivated land being embraced under that designation; the exclusive construction of canals, kanats, and irrigation works of every description; the first refusal of a national bank, and of all future enterprises connected with the introduction of roads, telegraphs, mills, factories, workshops, and public works of every description; and a farm of the entire customs of the empire for a period of twenty-five years from March 1, 1874, upon payment to the Shah of a stipulated sum for the first five years, and of an additional sixty per cent of the net revenue for the remaining twenty. With respect to the other profits, twenty per cent of those accruing from railways, and fifteen per cent of those derived from all other sources, were reserved for the Persian Government.

The concession was met with not only domestic outrage in the form of local protests, but hostility from the Russian government as well. Under immense pressure, Naser al-Din Shah cancelled the agreement despite his deteriorating financial situation. The concession cancellation was also due to the refusal of the British government to support Reuter's unrealistic ambitions. While the concession lasted for approximately a year, the entire debacle set the foundation for the 1890 Tobacco Protest, as it demonstrated that any attempt by a foreign power to infringe upon Iranian sovereignty would infuriate the local population as well as rival European powers, in this case the Russian government, which had its own interests in the region.

The cancellation, however, resulted in the second Reuter concession, which led to the formation of Imperial Bank of Persia by Baron de Reuter.
