= Massignon =

Massignon is a surname, and may refer to:

- Geneviève Massignon (1921–1966), French linguist, ethnologist, musicologist and historian
- Louis Massignon (1883–1962), French Catholic scholar of Islam
- Pierre Henry Ferdinand Massignon (1855–1922), French sculptor known as Pierre Roche
