= Shi'i Reformation in Iran: The Life and Theology of Shari'at Sangelaji =

2015 book by Ali Rahnema

- First edition
- Author: Ali Rahnema
- Language: English
- Subject: Shari'at Sangelaji
- Publisher: Routledge
- Publication date: 2015
- Media type: Print
- Pages: 194 pp.
- ISBN: 9781472434166

Shi'i Reformation in Iran: The Life and Theology of Shari'at Sangelaji is a 2015 book by Ali Rahnema in which the author examines Sangelaji’s reformist discourse from a theological standpoint.

== Content ==
Rahnema argues that as a pioneer of Islamic revival, Sangelaji has challenged some common Shi'i ideas and the mainstream clerical system. He provides a fresh reading of Sangelaji's reformist ideas from a theological perspective, and offers readers a close insight about the main religious debates in 1940s in Iran. Rahnema shows that far from being reform resistant, discussions around why and how to change the faith have long been at the center of Shi'i Islam. Based on the writings and sermons of Sangelaji and also interviews with his son, the author provides a comprehensive introduction to the reformist's views. Rahnema compares Sangelaji's views to those of Martin Luther, because Sangelaji emphasizes the primacy of the Quran and argues for questioning and cleansing Islamic doctrines.

== Reception ==
The book has been reviewed in Comparative Islamic Studies and Shii Studies Review. Mariella Ourghi calls the book "a useful contribution to modern Muslim reformist thinking" though she criticizes the book for being "mainly descriptive" and ignoring "the reception of Sangelajī’s writings and sermons".

Paul Luft believes that the book is "an important and well-researched study about one of the eminent Shi’i reformers in twentieth-century Iran". Hasan Yousefi Eshkevari describes it as one of the most reliable books on Sangelaji and his thoughts. A review by Juya Arvin in Radio Zamaneh states that the book provides a close insight about the influence of Sangelaji's ideas and is a good introduction to the study of reformist religious views.
