= An Islamic Utopian =

1998 biography of Ali Shariati by Ali Rahnema

An Islamic Utopian: A Political Biography of Ali Shariati
- Author: Ali Rahnema
- Language: English
- Subject: Ali Shariati's life
- Publisher: I.B. Tauris
- Publication date: 1998, 2000 (second edition)
- Media type: Print
- Pages: 418 pp.
- ISBN: 978-1-86064-552-5

An Islamic Utopian: A Political Biography of Ali Shariati is a 1998 book by Ali Rahnema in which the author examines the life and works of Ali Shariati. It has been translated into Persian, Arabic, Turkish and Indonesian. This book is the first close study of Ali Shariati in English.

== Reception ==
The book has already received positive reviews by Donna Robinson Divine, Vanessa Martin and Behrooz Ghamari-Tabrizi
