= All the Shah's Men =

2003 non-fiction book by Stephen Kinzer

All the Shah's Men: An American Coup and the Roots of Middle East Terror
- Author: Stephen Kinzer
- Language: English
- Subject: 1953 Iranian coup d'état
- Genre: Narrative history
- Published: 2003
- Publisher: Wiley
- Pages: 272
- ISBN: 9780471265177
- Dewey Decimal: 955.053
- LC Class: DS318 .K49 2003

All the Shah's Men: An American Coup and the Roots of Middle East Terror is a non-fiction book by Stephen Kinzer, published in 2003 by Wiley, that centers on the 1953 Iranian coup d'état, an operation orchestrated by the United States and the United Kingdom that led to the overthrow of Mohammad Mosaddegh, Iran's democratically elected Prime Minister. The book was generally well received by critics.

== Content summary ==
The summary of the book's content has been written based on its Persian translation by Shahryar Khavvajian; its bibliography:

Kinzer, Stephen (c. 2023). Mo’allemi, Bahram (ed.). همه‌ی مردان شاه: کودتای آمریکایی ۲۸ مرداد و ریشه‌های ترور در خاورمیانه [All the Shah's Men: An American Coup and the Roots of Middle East Terror] (in Persian). Translated by Khavvajian, Shahryar. Tehran: Akhtarān Publications.

The book presents its material across 12 chapters, along with a preface and an epilogue. The first chapter recounts Kermit Roosevelt's arrival in Iran, his dealings with the Shah, his taking charge of Operation Ajax against Mosaddegh, and the failure of that coup, 4 days before its success. In the second chapter, Kinzer briefly outlines the history and civilization of Iran and discusses the depth of Shi'a culture in the country. In the third chapter, Kinzer describes the Qajar-era treaties with foreign powers, depicts Iran's miserable condition during that period, speaks about the Iranian Constitutional Revolution and the country's entry into World War I, and addresses the rise of the Pahlavi government and Reza Shah, as well as his downfall.

Chapter 4 examines Britain's oil agreement with Iran and provides a brief biography of Mosaddegh from his birth to the 1943–44 Iranian legislative election. Chapter 5 introduces the Tudeh Party, discusses Kashani, covers Mosaddegh's emergence as a national hero, and describes the challenges between Iran and Britain over oil. In Chapter 6, Kinzer describes the American public's reaction to the tension between Iran and Britain, explains the difference between the attitudes of Truman's America and pre-Churchill-Britain toward Iran, discusses how this difference in behavior made Mosaddegh a more central figure in Iran, and continues the narrative of the oil negotiations between Iran and Britain.

In Chapter 7, it recounts the story of Averell Harriman's presence in Iran, his conversations with Mosaddegh and with Kashani, and the overt and covert measures taken by the British government against Iran and aimed at weakening its economy. (At the end of this chapter, there are about ten pages of images related to the figures, locations, and issues discussed in the book, usually accompanied by captions written by the author.) In Chapter 8, the author tells the story of Mosaddegh's trip to New York City to attend the Security Council, describes his arrival in Washington and his meeting with Truman, and discusses Churchill's rise to power as Prime Minister in Britain and the resulting change in the British government's behavior toward Iran and the oil dispute. Chapter 9 covers the 1952 Iranian legislative election in Iran, the seizure of the Rosemary oil tanker carrying Iranian oil by British warships, the widespread public support for Mosaddegh, a brief account of Fazlollah Zahedi, Churchill's success in persuading Truman to take action against Iran, a brief account of Kermit Roosevelt, the exit of British intelligence agents from Iran, and the renewed hopes for action against Iran with the 1952 U.S. presidential election and Eisenhower's victory.

In Chapter 10, it describes Eisenhower's coming to power, the United States' takeover of Iran's covert intelligence network that had previously been controlled by Britain, gives a summary of John and Allen Dulles, describes the Rashidian brothers, who were among the key figures in Britain's spy network in Iran, and recounts the decision by the United States and Britain to overthrow Mosaddegh through an operation called Ajax by the Americans and Boot by the British. It also discusses the thesis of the rift between Mosaddegh and Kashani. In Chapter 11, it recounts Roosevelt's planning for the overthrow operation, the stages of carrying out the operation, and ultimately the overthrow and arrest of Mosaddegh. In Chapter 12, it describes Mosaddegh's court sessions, the creation of Iran's secret police, SAVAK, Mosaddegh's exile in the village of Ahmadabad until the end of his life, his death in March 1967, the way Mosaddegh became taboo in the language and culture of Iranian society under the government, the fall of the Shah, the early takeover of the government by Khomeini's allies who shared Mosaddegh's views, a brief account of what happened to some of the individuals involved in the coup after the coup, the hostage-taking at the U.S. embassy in Iran, the difference between the radical Islam governing Iran and Mosaddegh and his character, a brief outline of the factors that led to the coup, and the remarks of some American historians about the coup.

== Release and reception ==
=== Release ===
All the Shah's Men, written by Stephen Kinzer and published in 2003 through Wiley at 272 pages, later received its first audiobook edition in 2008, released on CD by Tantor Media and read by Michael Prichard across 9 discs (10 hr., 34 min.). The Persian translation was published for the first time in 1382 SH (2003 or 2004) by multiple translators and through multiple publications.

=== Critical response ===
All the Shah's Men was generally well received by critics. Warren Bass of The New York Times offered a broadly positive yet stylistically cautious assessment, highlighting the book's vivid narrative style and use of newly revealed CIA documentation, noting that Kinzer’s reconstruction of Operation Ajax often reads more like an adventure story than conventional history, while strongly portraying Mohammad Mosaddegh as a nationalist leader with some eccentric traits. Chris Abbott praised the work for its succinct overview of Iranian history and clear explanation of the 1953 coup that deposed Mosaddegh, linking it to subsequent events such as the 1979 Revolution and even 9/11, presenting a compelling introduction to historical dynamics shaping modern attitudes toward Western involvement in the Middle East. Brown from Foreign Affairs commended Kinzer for crafting a crisp, readable narrative grounded in scholarly accounts, memoirs, and official records, including the CIA's once-classified history, providing context on Iranian history and political culture while detailing the coup and its long-term repercussions. Kirkus Reviews highlighted the book's well-argued narrative and detailed coverage of key figures—including Mosaddegh, the CIA, and the shah—attending carefully to historical context from Truman's sympathy for nationalist movements to Eisenhower's covert operations, though noting that readers sensitive to the human cost of intervention might find the focus on strategy somewhat detached. Hugh Galford of Washington Report on Middle East Affairs provides a strongly positive assessment of the book, framing it as both an educational historical narrative and a work with significant contemporary relevance. He argues the book is essential reading for understanding the roots of anti-American sentiment in Iran and for drawing lessons from a historical example of short-sighted foreign policy.

=== Accolades ===
The book was included in The Economist and The Washington Post 2003 list of best books.

== See also ==
Behind the 1953 Coup in Iran, a similar book by Ali Rahnema
