= Goftoguhâye Tanhâʼi =

Collection of essays by Ali Shariati

Goftoguhâ-ye Tanhâʼi
- Author: Ali Shariati
- Working title: گفتگوهای تنهایی
- Language: Persian
- Publisher: unknown

Goftoguhâ-ye Tanhâʼi or Chats in Solitude (Persian: گفتگوهای تنهایی) is a collection of Ali Shariati’s essays. In the book, he considered to his world view.

== Description ==
It seems that chats in solitude could be counted among those books of shariati which are of relation with his world view and attitudes. The book has two volumes. The first volume contains information on the sources of shariati in that book and also consisted of the system he used for arranging the material. The second volume included of sixty essays of different subjects. Also there are fifteen appendices along with five interviews. Also there is an essay considered with the world view of shariati. He try to choose the society which is the high level of the form in literature and reflection. He talked with society in chats solitude.

In last essay, He try to respond to an some kind philosophically question namely: “what we are?”. Of course, Shariate’s approach is negative in responding. In other word he death with the question of “what we are not”. He responded that we are not materialist and Marxist. He has rendered different reasons under each heading. There is no clues as to whether the interviews are real or imaginary. The book compiles after the suspicious death of shariati. It is possible that chats in solitude would be very book that he mentioned in kavir as parts of his being. Also the structure of the last essay in the book is peculiar. Sometimes they begins in the middle of a sentence. Sometimes there is no conclusion and there is no date for them. They are very disorder in style.

=== Affection of existentialism ===
One of those clear characters of the book is concerned with the existentialism. In other word, Reader of book undoubtedly confront with the existentialist impression like solitude. Sara shariati believes that the book could be counted not only as an autobiography but as many auto biography.

== See also ==
- Ali Shariati
- Hubut in Kavir
- Kavir (book)
