= The Pioneers of Islamic Revival =

1994 book edited by Ali Rahnema

- Author: Ali Rahnema
- Language: English
- Subject: Islamic revival
- Publisher: Zed Books
- Publication date: 1994 (1st ed), 2005 (2nd ed)
- Media type: Print
- Pages: 347 pp.
- ISBN: 978-1-85649-254-6

The Pioneers of Islamic Revival is a 1994 book edited by Ali Rahnema in which the authors examine prominent figures in the modern Islamic political revival.

== Essays ==
- Sayyid Jamal al-Din al-Afghani / Nikki R. Keddie
- Muhammad Abduh: pioneer of Islamic reform / Yvonne Haddad
- Khomeini's search for perfection: theory and reality / Baqer Moin
- Mawdudi and the Jama'at-i Islami: the origins, theory and practice of Islamic revivalism / Seyyed Vali Reza Nasr
- Hasan al-Banna (1906-1949) / David Commins
- Sayyid Qutb: the political vision / Charles R. H. Tripp
- Musa al-Sadr / Augustus Richard Norton
- Ali Shariati: teacher, preacher, rebel / Ali Rahnema
- Muhammad Baqer as-Sadr / Chibli Mallat

== Reception ==
The book has been reviewed in Middle Eastern Studies, Review of Middle East Studies and International Socialism.

Chris Harman believes that this book is welcome because many liberals who "lump all strands of political Islam (or ‘Islamism’) together", show a complete ignorance of "the history of political Islam and of the myriad of different organisations and beliefs that fall under that title today."

John Cooper calls the book "a judicious and well-conceived collection" which is useful for anyone "concerned with the politics of the modern Islamic world".
