= Overthrow =

Overthrow may refer to:

- Overthrow, a change in government, often achieved by force, through a coup d'état or revolution.
  - The 5th October Overthrow, or Bulldozer Revolution, the events of 2000 that led to the downfall of Slobodan Milošević in the former Yugoslavia
  - Overthrow of the Hawaiian Monarchy, the 1893 coup d'état by European and American businessmen that overthrew Queen Lili`uokalani of Hawai'i
  - Independence
- Overthrow (book), a 2006 book by Stephen Kinzer about the United States's involvement in overthrowing governments
- Overthrow (cricket), an extra run scored by a batsman as a result of the ball not being collected by a fielder in the centre, having been thrown in from the outfield
- Overthrow (structure), the crowning section of ornamental wrought iron work which forms a decorative crest above a wrought iron gate
- Overthrow (comics), a DC Comics supervillain who fought the Blue Beetle
- Overthrow, a 2001 EP by American death metal band Misery Index
