= Fatemeh Is Fatemeh =

Book by Ali Shariati

- Author: Ali Shariati
- Original title: فاطمه، فاطمه است
- Language: Farsi
- Published: 1971
- Publication place: Iran

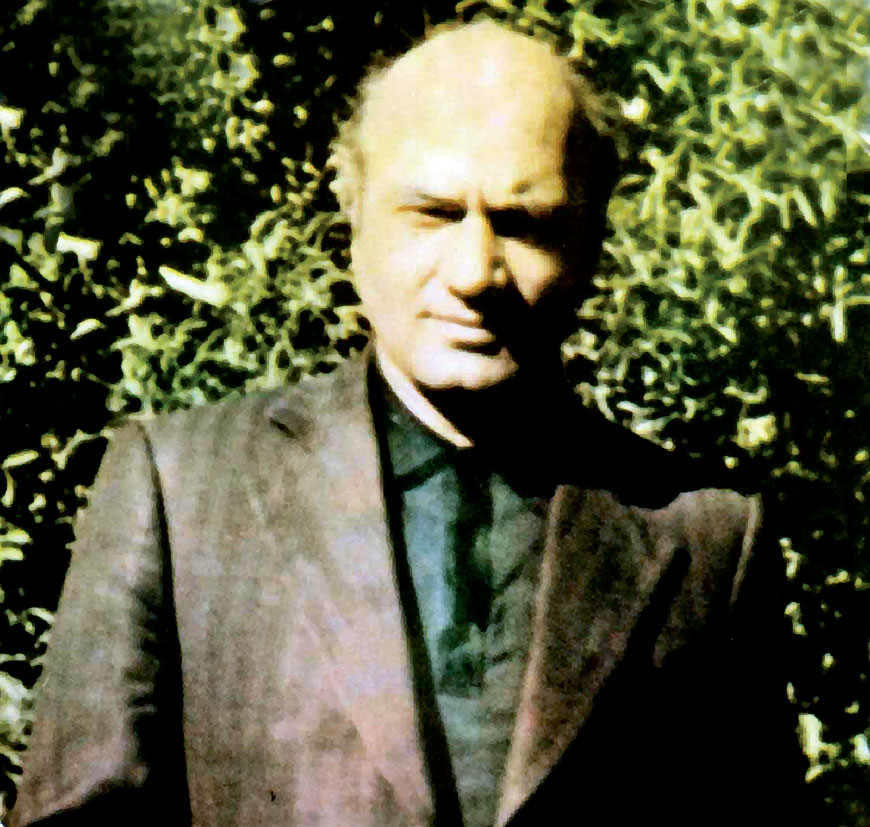
Shariati's speeches attracted the attention of the Pahlavi regime.

Fatemeh is Fatemeh (Persian: فاطمه، فاطمه است) is a book about Fatima, the daughter of Islamic prophet Muhammed, written by Ali Shariati. The book was written in 1971.

== Background ==
The book was written prior to the Iranian Revolution.

Ali Shariati introduced Fatima as a revolutionary Muslim woman in his famous lecture and subsequent book Fatima is Fatima (1971).

== Synopsis ==
Shariati presents Fatima, the daughter of Prophet Muhammad, as an independent historical figure embodying resistance, social justice, and revolutionary action. Shariati's portrayal moves beyond traditional religious narratives, framing her as a model for young Muslim women engaged in sociopolitical struggles. He crafts Fatima’s image in response to two key socio-political phenomena of the 1970s: the constrained role of women in political activism and the lack of a collective revolutionary Islamic identity for young Muslim women. By emphasizing her defiance against political injustice and her commitment to social change, Shariati constructs Fatima as a symbol of resistance, paralleling the struggles of contemporary revolutionary women in Iran.

Fatima is described as a role model for Muslim women, and as a manifestation and symbol of 'Islamic thought'. He says that within the ever-changing world, Fatima remains a role model. Shariati also admonishes the ulema for not giving sufficient teachings about the lives of Muhammad’s family members.

== Analysis ==
Shariati's discourse sought to mobilize Muslim women into revolutionary action, positioning Islam as a liberating force against imperialism and oppression. Shariati’s Fatima stands in contrast to both Western consumerist models and traditional passive roles for women. Instead, he envisions a new archetype: the revolutionary Muslim woman who is intellectually engaged, politically active, and committed to transforming society. His interpretation played a crucial role in shaping the collective revolutionary identity of many Iranian women leading up to the 1979 Islamic Revolution. By writing this book he was to complete the work of French scholar Professor Louis Massignon.

== See also ==
- Expectations from the Muslim Woman, 1975 lecture by Shariati
- List of Shi'a books
