= Le Vieux-Marché =

Le Vieux-Marché Ar C'houerc'had
- Commune
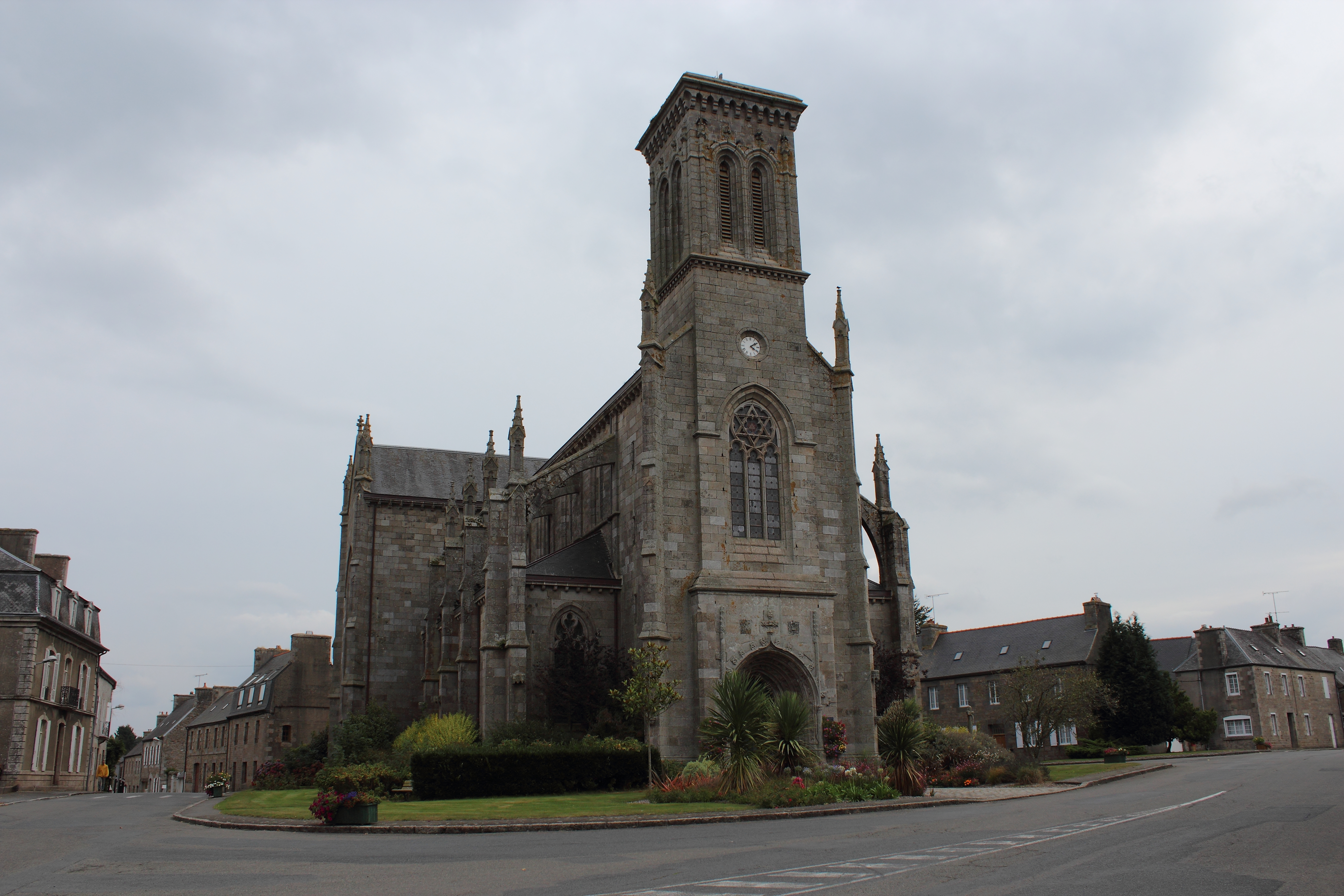
- The church of Notre-Dame, in Le Vieux-Marché
- Location of Le Vieux-Marché
- Location within France Location within Brittany
- Coordinates: 48°36′28″N 3°26′48″W
- Country: France
- Region: Brittany
- Department: Côtes-d'Armor
- Arrondissement: Lannion
- Canton: Plestin-les-Grèves
- Intercommunality: Lannion-Trégor Communauté

Government
  - Mayor (2020–2026): Alain Garzuel
- Area^{1}: 23.13 km^{2} (8.93 sq mi)
- Highest elevation: 192 m (630 ft)
- Lowest elevation: 27 m (89 ft)
- Population (2023): 1,299
  - Density: 56.16/km^{2} (145.5/sq mi)
- Time zone: UTC+01:00 (CET)
  - Summer (DST): UTC+02:00 (CEST)
- INSEE/Postal code: 22387 /22420
- ^{1} French Land Register data, which excludes lakes, ponds, glaciers > 1 km^{2} (0.386 sq mi or 247 acres) and river estuaries.

Le Vieux-Marché (French pronunciation: [lə vjø maʁʃe]; Breton: Ar C'houerc'had) is a commune in the Côtes-d'Armor department of Brittany in northwestern France.

== Population ==
Inhabitants of Le Vieux-Marché are called vieux-marchois in French.

== History ==
Since the 6th century, a sanctuary dedicated to the Seven Sleepers of Ephesus existed in the town (possibly brought here by oriental monks). Between 1703 and 1704, a chapel was built on top of it in the form of a Latin cross oriented towards the east. It has two side chapels and the one on the south side is built over the dolmen of Stiffell which forms the crypt.

During the time of the Algerian War, Louis Massignon, a catholic scholar of Islam, established a Christian-Muslim pilgrimage to this place as the Seven Sleepers are venerated both in Christianity and Islam. He had discovered the place through his daughter, Geneviève Massignon and it began to hold an important place in his spirituality. Starting in 1954, he set up the pilgrimages modelled after typical Breton pardons which since 1955 have been also attended by Muslims.

After the end of French Algeria, the bell of the Catholic cathedral in Algiers was hung in the church of Vieux-Marché in 1965.

== See also ==
- Communes of the Côtes-d'Armor department
