= Ba Mukhatabhaye Ashna =

- Author: Ali Shariati
- Working title: با مخاطب های آشنا
- Language: Persian
- Publisher: unknown

Ba Mukhatabhaye Ashna or To Acquainted Addresses (Persian: با مخاطب های آشنا) is a book by Ali Shariati. The book contains letters written to the author's family and friends during 1971-1977.

== Introduction ==
The book is considered among the group of Shariati’s books containing his strictly personal writings, and is not included among his lectures. The book is a collection of twenty-nine letters. The contents of the book were written to the author's father, wife, children, close friends and other acquaintances between the years 1971-1977. The book also contains a public lecture, a piece addressed to God, his two last wills and testaments and an incomplete note. Among these letters, approximately twelve are addressed to Ihsan, his son. Three letters are addressed to his father, three to his wife, two to 'Mr. Minach', two to an unknown woman, one letter to his daughters, one letter to Mr. HujjatI-i Kirmani, one letter to "the friends at Irshad," one letter to a brother, one letter to a friend, and one letter to "an unknown". The book reveals the political and mystical compasses of Shariati in such a way that it is possible to observe his opinions on different social, political and mystical issues. In a letter to his son, he considers several concepts including love, justice and freedom. Shariati is shown to believe that these three elements are strongly linked.

== Attitude ==
Indeed, Shariati tried to produce a new attitude and a commentary of Ijtihad and a symbolic interpretation of revelation)). Furthermore, he presented consensus or Ijma and reason as foundations of Ijtihad making use of this new attitude. He insisted on the impoTaghriirf the Taghriir and the method of Muhammad’s behavior compared to action and saying. He believed that the aspect of the prophet’s behavior is more sensible, immortal and general. However, he proposed to use “science and time” in place of “reason and consensus”. He believed that science could help the jurisprudence.

== Part of text ==
In a letter dated the last night of the year 1976, and written on the last pages of KullTyat-Shams Tabrizi, Shariati recounts how twice RümI's Mathnawï had saved his life. The case of the first incident is particularly interesting since it shows a direct influence of Sufism on Shariati:

And Mawlawïi twice saved me from dying: the first was the years of adolescence [the years of] psychological crisis. Because I had started reading primarily with the works of (Maurice] Maeterlinck. And [considering] those dubious and aimless thoughts which maddened a genius like him, it is obvious what they would do to the mind of a twelve-year-old student of the sixth grade. This mental dispersion became stormier and more maddening in the world of Sufism that had strongly attracted me (in my state of] immaturity.(Ali Shariati, Ba Mukhatabhâ-yi Ashna, p. 99)
