= Lycée Louis-Massignon =

Lycée Louis-Massignon may refer to:

- Lycée français international Louis-Massignon, in Casablanca, Morocco
- Lycée Louis-Massignon, in Abu Dhabi, United Arab Emirates, a school directly operated by the Agency for French Education Abroad (AEFE)

== See also ==
- Louis Massignon
