= Hubut in Kavir =

Book by Ali Shariati

- Author: Ali Shariati
- Original title: هبوط در کویر
- Language: Persian
- Publisher: unknown

Hubut in Kavir (Persian: هبوط در کویر) or Falling in the Desert, is one of the eminent books by Iranian author Ali Shariati. The book is an extended article.

Hubut literally means falling of man from heaven to earth. Hubut exemplifies Shariati's style of writing. He tried to envisage the existential dimension of humans's spirit and soul. The book has no introduction, formal conclusion, or body. It continuously digresses from one context to another without a normal style. The book begins with an account of the creation of man. Man is at the same time could be considered as Adam and Shariati. At the end of Hubut, there is a plan for creation which is different one from existing one. According to planned creation, the heaven has brought to earth and therefore there appeared an eternal peace and joy. In fact, the original theme of Hubut is creation. Shariati describes a moving day by day account of the days of creation and specifically the story of the Covenant. Shariati interpretation of Satan’s disobedience is identical with mystical accounts in nature. He believes that it was lave that prevented Satan from bowing to anybody except his beloved. He used many digressions to through abnormal statements and phrases. In other word, he makes several unorthodox propositions contributed to the significance of Hubut for understanding Shariati. Completely contrary to Hegel and his philosophy of history, Shariati believed that it is not true that the civilized human is less consciousness than now peoples but rather there is a difference between them. The civilized man could talk on himself more that universe and the new people are so concerned with reality and universe that there is no place for himself and mysticism and religion. Of course he knows the movement of soul in Hegel's philosophy and history in one sense as right. In other word it seems that Shariati explained his reflection on the philosophy of history somehow in Hubut. He mentioned somebodies who are familiar and acquaintances with him during the history such as Ayn Al Qazat, Prometheus, Abul Ala Marri. He also considered with the art. he counted art as a shelter for himself. One other aspect of the book is that Shariati refers to his understanding of the degrees of religiosity of believers.

Quote:

No "one" made me. God did. Not in a way that "someone wanted" since I had no one, my one was God, the one of those without any one. It was he who made me. In any way that he wanted. He neither asked me [how to make me], nor asked that "other me" of me. I was ownerless clay clay. He blow me from his spirit into it [the clay], and left me alone on the earth and under the sun.

== See also ==
- Kavir (book)
