= Red Shi'ism vs. Black Shi'ism =

Essay by Ali Shariati

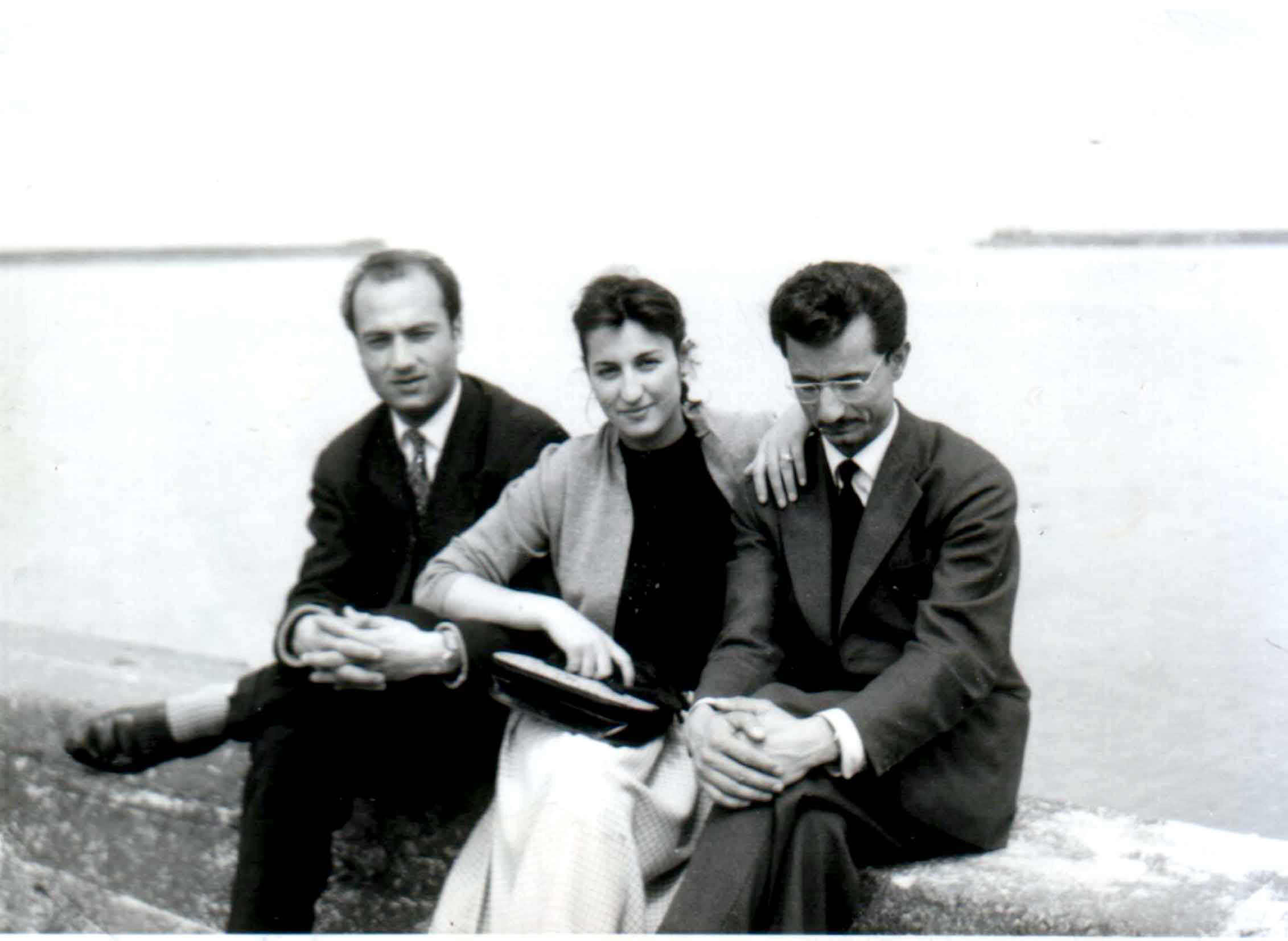
Shariati and his wife, Pouran Shariat Razavi

Red Shi'sm vs. Black Shi'ism is an essay written by the Iranian author Ali Shariati which discusses his ideas on the perceived dual aspects of the Shi'a religion throughout history. Red Shi'ism, which he sees as the pure form of the religion, is concerned with social justice and salvation for the masses and is devoid of idolatrous rituals and established clergy. Black Shi'ism, which he sees as the deviated form of the religion, falls under the domination of both monarchy and clergy, out of touch with the needs of the masses, and which came to be established in Iran under the Safavids.

It must be known that the Safavid dynasty did not form the idea of Black Shi'ism, but that this idea was formed after the defeat of Shah Ismail against the Ottoman leader Yavuz Sultan Selim. Black Shi'ism is a product of the post-Safavid period.

== See also ==
- Alevi, also called Red Head Alevi Shiites.
