= Horr =

Book by Ali Shariati

Horr (Persian: حر)
- Author: Ali Shariati
- Language: Persian
- Published: 1977
- Publication place: Iran

Horr (Persian: حر) is a book by the Iranian author Ali Shariati about the historic Battle of Karbala in which Hussein, the grandson of the Muslim prophet Muhammad, was killed by Yazid. Horr was a commander of the army of Yazid during the battle. First involved in fighting Hussein, Horr defected from the army of Yazid, joined Hussein, and was killed by Yazid's forces. The book examines fate, choice, and predestination as portrayed by Horr's decision to switch sides during the fateful battle.
