= Stephen Kinzer =

American journalist and author (born 1951)

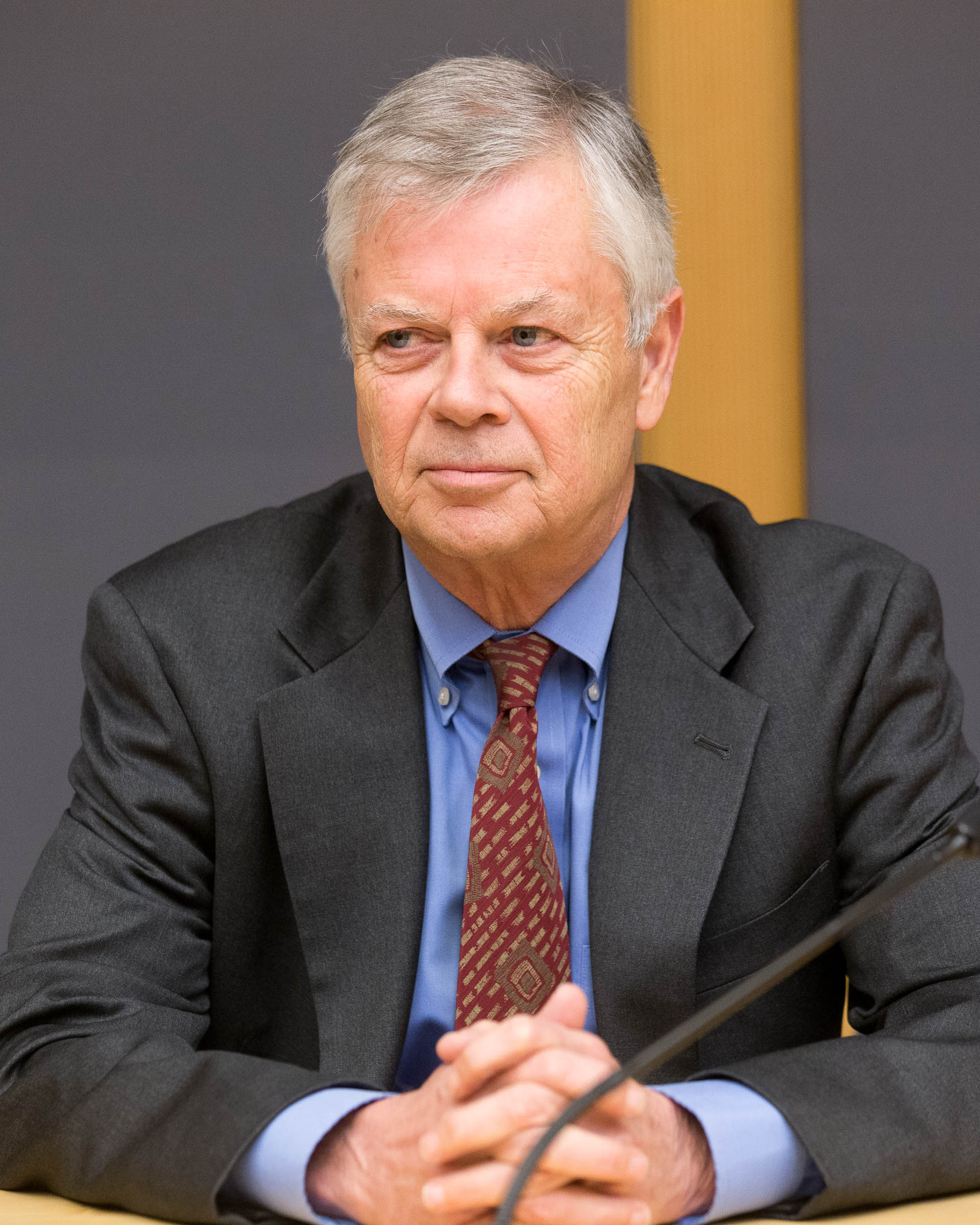
- Born: August 4, 1951 (age 75)
- Education: Boston University (BA)
- Known for: American author, journalist, and academic
- Website: http://www.stephenkinzer.com

Stephen Kinzer (born August 4, 1951) is an American author, historian, and journalist. A former New York Times correspondent, he has published several books and writes for several newspapers and news agencies.

== Reporting career ==
During the 1980s, Kinzer covered revolutions and social upheaval in Central America and wrote his first book, Bitter Fruit, about military coups and destabilization in Guatemala during the 1950s. In 1990, The New York Times appointed Kinzer to head its Berlin bureau, from which he covered Eastern and Central Europe as they emerged from the Soviet bloc. Kinzer was The New York Times chief in the newly established Istanbul bureau from 1996 to 2000.

Upon returning to the U.S., Kinzer became the newspaper's culture correspondent, based in Chicago, as well as teaching at Northwestern University. He then took up residence in Boston and began teaching journalism and U.S. foreign policy at Boston University. He has written several nonfiction books about Turkey, Central America, Iran, and the U.S. overthrow of foreign governments from the late 19th century to the present, as well as Rwanda's recovery from genocide.

Kinzer also contributes columns to The New York Review of Books, The Guardian, and The Boston Globe. He is a Senior Fellow in International and Public Affairs at the Watson Institute for International and Public Affairs at Brown University.

In June 2026 Kinzer testified before the House Oversight and Government Reform Committee's Task Force on the Declassification of Federal Secrets on the subject of Project MKULTRA.

== Views ==
Kinzer's reporting on Central America was criticized by Edward S. Herman and Noam Chomsky in their book Manufacturing Consent (1988), which cited Édgar Chamorro ("selected by the CIA as press spokesman for the contras") in his interview by Fairness and Accuracy in Reporting describing Kinzer as "just responding to what the White House is saying". In chapter 2 of Manufacturing Consent, Kinzer is criticized for deploying no skepticism in his coverage of the murders of GAM leaders in Guatemala and for "generally employing an apologetic framework" for the Guatemalan military state.

Kinzer has since that time criticized interventionist U.S. foreign policy toward Latin America and more recently, the Middle East. In Overthrow: America's Century of Regime Change From Hawaii to Iraq (2006), he critiqued U.S. foreign policy as overly interventionist. In a 2010 interview with Imagineer Magazine, he said:

The effects of U.S. intervention in Latin America have been overwhelmingly negative. They have had the effect of reinforcing brutal and unjust social systems and crushing people who are fighting for what we would actually call "American values." In many cases, if you take Chile, Guatemala, or Honduras for examples, we actually overthrew governments that had principles similar to ours and replaced those democratic, quasi-democratic, or nationalist leaders with people who detest everything the United States stands for.

In his 2008 book A Thousand Hills: Rwanda's Rebirth and the Man who Dreamed It, Kinzer credits President Paul Kagame for what he calls the peace, development, and stability in Rwanda in the years after the Rwandan genocide, and criticizes Rwanda's leaders before the genocide, such as Juvenal Habyarimana. According to Susan M. Thomson, the "book is an exercise in public relations, aimed at further enhancing Kagame's stature in the eyes of the west", is one-sided due to heavy reliance on interviews with Kagame and even apologist.

In a 2016 opinion piece, Kinzer wrote that Aleppo had been liberated by Bashar al-Assad's forces from the violent militants who had ruled it for three years, but that the American public had been told "convoluted nonsense" about the war. He added:

At the recent debate in Milwaukee, Hillary Clinton claimed that United Nations peace efforts in Syria were based on 'an agreement I negotiated in June of 2012 in Geneva.' The precise opposite is true. In 2012 Secretary of State Clinton joined Turkey, Saudi Arabia, and Israel in a successful effort to kill Kofi Annan's UN peace plan because it would have accommodated Iran and kept Assad in power, at least temporarily. No one on the Milwaukee stage knew enough to challenge her.

In April 2018, he added:

According to the logic behind American strategy in the Middle East—and the rest of the world—one of our principal goals should be to prevent peace or prosperity from breaking out in countries whose governments are unfriendly to us. That outcome in Syria would have results we consider intolerable.

Kinzer wrote that the 2018 Douma chemical attack was a "false flag" attack, suggesting the event was staged by either al-Qaeda, NATO, or Syrian Civil Defense.

== Bibliography ==
Title	Year	ISBN	Publisher	Subject matter	Interviews, presentations, and reviews	Comments
Bitter Fruit: The Story of the American Coup in Guatemala	1982	ISBN 9780385148610	Doubleday	1954 Guatemalan coup d'état		Written with Stephen Schlesinger. Revised edition, 1999, Harvard University Press, ISBN 9780674075900.
Blood of Brothers: Life and War in Nicaragua	1991	ISBN 9780399135941	G. P. Putnam's Sons	Nicaraguan Revolution		Revised edition, 2007, Harvard University Press, ISBN 9780399135941.
Crescent and Star: Turkey Between Two Worlds	2001	ISBN 9780374131432	Farrar, Straus and Giroux	Turkey	Booknotes interview with Kinzer on Crescent & Star, October 21, 2001, C-SPAN	
All the Shah's Men: An American Coup and the Roots of Middle East Terror	2003	ISBN 9781681620619	John Wiley & Sons	1953 Iranian coup d'état, Mohammad Mosaddegh, Mohammad Reza Pahlavi	Presentation by Kinzer on All the Shah's Men, October 8, 2003, C-SPAN	
Overthrow: America's Century of Regime Change from Hawaii to Iraq	2006	ISBN 9780805078619	Times Books	United States involvement in regime change	Presentation by Kinzer on Overthrow, April 10, 2006, C-SPAN; Presentation by Kinzer on Overthrow, June 4, 2006, C-SPAN	
A Thousand Hills: Rwanda's Rebirth and the Man Who Dreamed It	2008	ISBN 9780470120156	John Wiley & Sons	Paul Kagame, Rwandan Civil War	Presentation by Kinzer on A Thousand Hills, June 18, 2008, C-SPAN	
Reset: Iran, Turkey, and America's Future	2010	ISBN 9780805091274	Times Books	Iran–U.S. relations, Israel–U.S. relations, Saudi Arabia–U.S. relations, Turkey–U.S. relations	Presentation by Kinzer on Reset, June 15, 2010, C-SPAN	Later published as Reset Middle East: Old Friends and New Alliances -- Saudi Arabia, Israel, Turkey, Iran, 2011, I. B. Tauris ISBN 9781848857650
The Brothers: John Foster Dulles, Allen Dulles, and Their Secret World War	2013	ISBN 9780805094978	Times Books	John Foster Dulles, Allen Dulles	Q&A interview with Kinzer on The Brothers, November 3, 2013, C-SPAN; Presentation by Kinzer on The Brothers, October 4, 2013, C-SPAN	
The True Flag: Theodore Roosevelt, Mark Twain, and the Birth of American Empire	2017	ISBN 9781627792165	Henry Holt and Co.	Theodore Roosevelt, Mark Twain, American imperialism	Presentation by Kinzer on The True Flag, January 26, 2017, C-SPAN	
Poisoner in Chief: Sidney Gottlieb and the CIA Search for Mind Control	2019	ISBN 9781250140432	Henry Holt and Co.	Sidney Gottlieb, MK-ULTRA	Presentation by Kinzer on Poisoner in Chief, October 3, 2019, C-SPAN	
Boiling Point: How America Brought War to Ukraine	2026	ISBN 9781250413086	Henry Holt and Co.	Russo-Ukrainian war		

== See also ==
- Timeline of United States military operations
