= The Secular Miracle: Religion, Politics, and Economic Policy in Iran =

1990 book by Ali Rahnema and Farhad Nomani

- Author: Ali Rahnema, Farhad Nomani
- Language: English
- Subject: Iranian politics
- Publisher: Zed Books
- Publication date: 1990
- Media type: Print
- Pages: 376 pp.
- ISBN: 978-0-86232-938-9

The Secular Miracle: Religion, Politics, and Economic Policy in Iran is a 1990 book by Ali Rahnema and Farhad Nomani in which the authors argue that the radical views of Islamic leaders of Iranian Revolution were modified/secularized during the first years of Islamic government.

== Reception ==
The book has received positive reviews in Iranian Studies and International Journal of Middle East Studies.
