= The Brothers (Kinzer book) =

2013 book by Stephen Kinzer

The Brothers: John Foster Dulles, Allen Dulles, and Their Secret World War
- Author: Stephen Kinzer
- Language: English
- Subject: Politics and government
- Publisher: Times Books
- Publication date: 2013
- Publication place: United States
- Pages: 416
- ISBN: 978-0-8050-9497-8

The Brothers: John Foster Dulles, Allen Dulles, and Their Secret World War is a 2013 book by the New York Times journalist and historian Stephen Kinzer. It has been described as "a riveting chronicle of government-sanctioned murder, casual elimination of 'inconvenient' regimes, relentless prioritization of American corporate interests and cynical arrogance on the part of two men who were once among the most powerful in the world." Kinzer traces how the activity of the Dulles brothers "helped set off some of the world's most profound long-term crises." It is based on secondary sources.

== Background ==
President Dwight Eisenhower gave the position of secretary of state to John Foster Dulles and the position of director of the CIA to Allen Dulles in 1953. It was the first and only time in history two brothers were appointed to head the overt and covert sides of American foreign policy.

== Context ==
The book mentions that the Dulles brothers play a vital role in leading the U.S. into the Vietnam War, and assisting to overthrow cold war governments such as Guatemala, Iran, the Congo, and Indonesia.

The book's first several chapters give information about the family background, childhoods, and college educations of the two brothers. In this way, some points of their personal life are provided: Foster was a devoted husband while Allen was an unfaithful one. Kinzer explains how the actions of the Dulles brothers were aimed at removing world leaders whom they considered dangerous to the American interests. The brothers had a significant effect on the United States foreign policy and global conflicts.

The book mentions "six monsters" that the "Dulles brothers believed had to be brought down": Mohammed Mossadegh in Iran, Jacobo Árbenz in Guatemala, Ho Chi Minh in Vietnam, Sukarno in Indonesia, Patrice Lumumba in the Congo, and Fidel Castro in Cuba. Ho Chi Minh and Castro espoused left-wing politics. The other leaders on the list were nationalists who campaigned for their country's independence. The book also discusses Iran at length. While explaining the careers of the brothers, Kinzer describes events from American history such as mind-control experiments “in which psychoactive drugs were administered to unknowing victims.”

== See also ==
- Poisoner in Chief
