= Poisoner in Chief =

2019 book by Stephen Kinzer

Poisoner in Chief: Sidney Gottlieb and the CIA Search for Mind Control
- Author: Stephen Kinzer
- Language: English
- Subject: Politics and government
- Publisher: Henry Holt and Co.
- Publication date: 2019
- Pages: 368
- ISBN: 978-1250140432

Poisoner in Chief: Sidney Gottlieb and the CIA Search for Mind Control is a 2019 book by The New York Times journalist and historian Stephen Kinzer. The book contains untold stories of a Central Intelligence Agency (CIA) chemist called Sidney Gottlieb, who tried to "find a way to control the human brain". In 1953, CIA director Allen Dulles appointed Gottlieb to "run the covert program".

In Poisoner in Chief, Kinzer explains the MKUltra program, which was developed by Gottlieb, and described how drugs such as LSD help the CIA to control the minds of enemies.

== Title ==
Gottlieb was the CIA chief chemist, who helped the CIA if it needed a poison. and he prepared a poison kit to be used in the assassination of Patrice Lumumba, former Prime Minister of the Democratic Republic of the Congo.

== Background ==
During the early period of the Cold War, the CIA imagined communists discovered "some kind of a drug or a potion or a technique that would allow them to control human minds". At that time, many movies and books referred to control minds so the CIA decided to obtain the technique of controlling the mind. The CIA started and ran the MKUltra project for 10 years. According to The Guardian, Gottlieb was known as "the CIA's chief poison-maker".

In 1955, R. Gordon Wasson decided to participate in a sacred Indian ceremony that was held in southern Mexico and called "pathway to the divine". According to Michael Pollan's book How to Change Your Mind and some others, Wasson's trip played an important role in "promoting mind-bending drugs and the accompanying cultural revolution". Poisoner in Chief provides information about this trip and the life of Wasson; he explained how the CIA supported the financial cost of the trip without knowing Wasson. Gottlieb, who "was the brains behind the eventual CIA program", managed Wasson's trip.

== Context ==
In 1952, Gottlieb formed a group of chemical scientists in one of the CIA's "black sites" located in Munich. They injected drugs into the prisoners and killed them after interrogation. Kinzer wrote; "Gottlieb and his chemical warriors believed they could transform a persistent legend into reality". The group was called MK-ULTRA; Kinzer details of the group's career. He has also used previous research by John Marks and the director of the Senate committee Frank Church. While the MK-Ultra project led to the deaths of prisoners, Gottlieb found mind control to be impossible. After closing this project, he worked on another CIA project associated with making "poisons and high-tech gadgets for spies to use".

According to Kinzer; "In one [mock interrogation], a military officer swore never to reveal a secret, revealed it under the influence of LSD, and afterward forgot the entire episode ... Gottlieb came to believe that [LSD] could be the key to mind control. He was the first acid visionary." Gottlieb employed US doctors to do more experiments on the effects of LSD. For instance, The Paul Hoch of New York Psychiatric Institute collaborated with him.

Kinzer describes Gottlieb as "a chemist with a deep-seated interest in mysticism" and "the first person the United States government ever hired to find ways to control human minds". Gottlieb, who was born into an Orthodox Jewish family, played a vital role in establishing the agency in the 1950s and 1960s. Gottlieb was supported by Allen Dulles, the director of central intelligence, who "believed deeply in mind-control experiments".

According to Dutch writer and activist Alex de Jong, some of the experiments mentioned in the book are surreal. For example, an experiment was performed on mentally handicapped children, to whom they fed "cereal laced with uranium and radioactive calcium".

Kinzer spent several years on research into MK-Ultra; he described it as the "most sustained search in history for techniques of mind control". Kinzer collected information by wide investigating, interviews, and unpublished reports that were released when Gottlieb died. Gottlieb did experiments on American citizens and used techniques of torture and testing that were applied by Nazi Germany.

== See also ==
- Timeline of United States military operations
- The Brothers: John Foster Dulles, Allen Dulles, and Their Secret World War
