= Superstition as Ideology in Iranian Politics =

2011 book by Ali Rahnema

Superstition as Ideology in Iranian Politics: From Majlesi to Ahmadinejad
- First edition
- Author: Ali Rahnema
- Language: English
- Subject: Iranian politics
- Publisher: Cambridge University Press
- Publication date: 2011
- Media type: Print
- Pages: 334 pp.
- ISBN: 978-1-139-49562-2

Superstition as Ideology in Iranian Politics: From Majlesi to Ahmadinejad is a 2011 book by Ali Rahnema in which the author examines the role of superstition in Iranian politics.

== Content ==
Rahnema argues that superstition as well as mystical beliefs have shaped political ideology and strategy in Iran from the first days of the Safavid dynasty in the sixteenth century until today. As author shows through a close examination of the Persian sources, and with sample instances from contemporary politics in Iran, the relation to the "hidden sphere" has allowed leaders such as Muhammad Reza Pahlavi and Mahmud Ahmadinejad to introduce themselves and their close associates as representatives of the divine, and their enemies and rivals as the messengers of evil.

The text includes an introduction, two sections (Part I - Politicizing Occult Islam and Part II - Popular Shi'ism), and a conclusion. Part I includes three chapters: 1 - Ahmadinejad; 2 - Mohammad-Reza Shah Pahlavi's Supernatural Shiʿism and Its Political Implications; and 3 - Shah Esma'il Safavi. Part II includes six chapters: 4 - Milieu, Childhood, Sanctity and Fame; 5 - From Conceptualization to Officialization of a Religio-political Ideology; 6 - Deficiency and Defectiveness of the Human Mind; 7 - Society Needs the Leadership of Jurists and/or Kings; 8 - Superstitious Education; 9 - Reconfigurating the Necessities of Belief; and 10 - Majlesism as an Ideology.

== Reception ==
The book was reviewed in Iranian Studies and Archives de sciences sociales des religions. In Iranian Studies, Eskandar Sadeghi-Boroujerdi wrote of the text, "The book offers a valuable and critical perspective on both Majlesi and Ahmadinejad, in keeping with the longstanding religious reforming trend inside Iran and the wider Shi'i world." In Archives de sciences sociales des religions, Sabrina Mervin critiqued the lack of clarity of the central definition of "superstition", as well as the over-reliance on primary sources instead of referencing the large canon of existing studies on the topic.
