= Islamic Economic Systems =

1994 book by Ali Rahnema and Farhad Nomani

- Author: Ali Rahnema, Farhad Nomani
- Language: English
- Subject: Islamic economics
- Publisher: Zed Books
- Publication date: 1994
- Media type: Print
- Pages: 222 pp.
- ISBN: 978-1-85649-057-3

Islamic Economic Systems is a 1994 book by Ali Rahnema and Farhad Nomani in which the authors examine "the central tenets of Islamic economics, both in theory and in practice". It has been translated into Bosnian and Malaysian.

== Reception ==
The book has received positive reviews in Digest of Middle East Studies and Islamic Studies.

== See also ==
- History of Islamic economics
- Islamic economics in Pakistan
