= Overthrow (book) =

2006 book by Stephen Kinzer

Overthrow: America's Century of Regime Change from Hawaii to Iraq
- Author: Stephen Kinzer
- Audio read by: Michael Prichard
- Language: English
- Subject: United States involvement in regime change
- Publisher: Times Books
- Publication date: 2006
- Publication place: United States
- Media type: Print (hardcover and paperback)
- Pages: 384
- ISBN: 978-0-8050-7861-9 (hardcover)
- OCLC: 907615158
- Dewey Decimal: 327.73009
- LC Class: E744 .K49 2006

Overthrow: America's Century of Regime Change from Hawaii to Iraq is a book published in 2006 by New York Times foreign correspondent and author Stephen Kinzer about the United States's involvement in the overthrow of foreign governments from the late 19th century to the present. According to Kinzer, the first such instance was the overthrow of the Kingdom of Hawaii in 1893, and continuing to America-led invasion of Iraq in 2003. His examples include mini-histories of the U.S.-supported or encouraged coups d'état in Hawaii, Cuba, Puerto Rico, the Philippines, Nicaragua, Honduras, Iran, Guatemala, South Vietnam, Chile, Grenada, Panama, Afghanistan, and Iraq.

Some examples used in the book refer to American support for local rebels against the existing national governments that led to a change in power. For example, in 1898, the United States helped to overthrow the government of Cuba by supporting local rebels who were already fighting their government. In other circumstances, such as in Iran, Guatemala, and Chile, Kinzer argues the United States initiated, planned and orchestrated the regime change.

This book talks about things such as how the United States, during its first real coup, decided to remove Nicaraguan President Zelaya from power, over the objections of officials like the United States Ambassador to Nicaragua, Finnegan Courtney, because they wanted the power of the canal. It also says that the United States tricked the Panamanians into independence from Colombia so that they could have the land to build the Panama Canal, and Colombia would not give them the land.

== Reception ==
Publishers Weekly wrote that Kinzer "makes a persuasive case that U.S. intervention destabilizes world politics and often leaves countries worse off than they were before."

Kirkus Reviews called it a "sobering and saddening book."
