= Comparative Islamic Studies =

Academic journal on religion

- Discipline: Islamic studies; Comparative religion, Interdisciplinary
- Language: English
- Edited by: Ulrika Mårtensson

Publication details
- History: 2005–present
- Publisher: Equinox (United Kingdom)
- Frequency: Biannually

Standard abbreviations
- ISO 4: Comp. Islam. Stud.

Indexing
- ISSN: 1740-7125 (print); 1743-1638 (web)

Links
- Journal homepage

Comparative Islamic Studies is a peer-reviewed academic journal published by Equinox.

== See also ==
- Buddhist-Christian Studies
