= Vanessa Martin =

British historian

- Born: 30 December 1946 (age 79)
- Scientific career
- Fields: history of modern Iran
- Workplaces: Royal Holloway, University of London

Vanessa Martin (born 30 December 1946) is a British historian and Emeritus Professor of Middle Eastern History at Royal Holloway, University of London. She is known for her research on the political, religious and social development of modern Iran from the nineteenth to the late twentieth century.

== Books ==
- Iran between Islamic Nationalism and Secularism: The Constitutional Revolution of 1906, Martin, V., 17 Sep 2013, London: I.B. Tauris.
- Iran's Constitutional Revolution: Popular Politics, Cultural Transformations and Transnational Connections, Martin, V. (ed.) & Chehabi, H. (ed.), 2010, London: I.B. Tauris.
- Anglo-Iranian Relations since 1800, Martin, V. (ed.), 2005, London: Routledge.
- The Qajar Pact. Bargaining Protest and the State in Nineteenth Century Iran, Martin, V., 2005, London: I.B. Tauris.
- Women, Religion and Culture in Iran, Martin, V. (ed.) & Ansari, S. (ed.), 2002, Richmond, Surrey: Curzon Press.
- Creating an Islamic State: Khomeini and the Making of a New Iran, Martin, V., 2000, London: I.B. Tauris.
- Islam and Modernism: the Iranian Revolution of 1906, Martin, V., 1989, London: I.B. Tauris.
