= Ali Shariati =

Iranian sociologist and philosopher (1933–1977)

- علی شریعتی
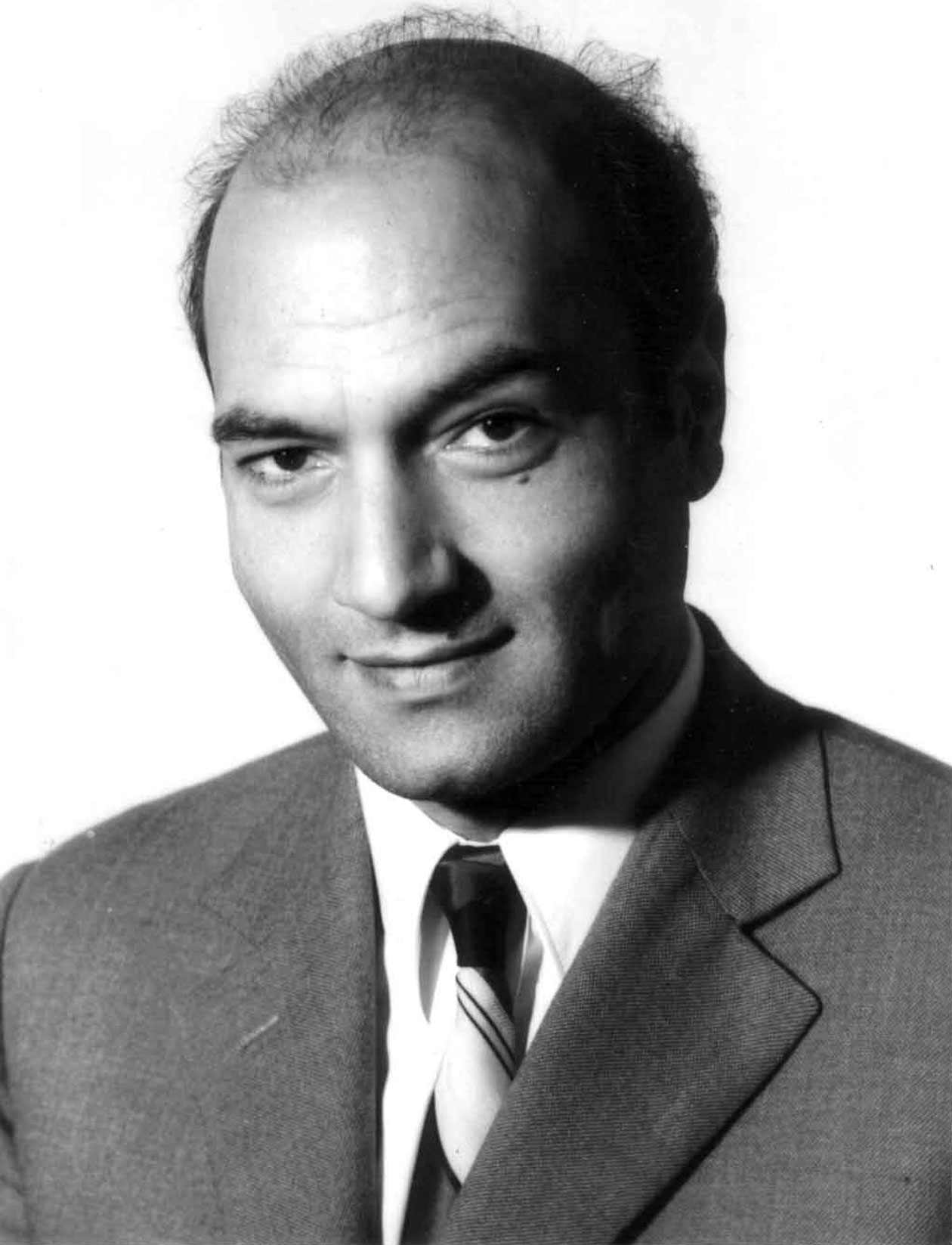
- Shariati in 1972
- Born: Ali Shariati Mazinani; 23 November 1933; Kahak, Iran
- Died: 18 June 1977 (aged 43); Southampton, England
- Resting place: Sayyidah Zaynab Mosque, Damascus, Syria
- Education: Ferdowsi University of Mashhad; University of Paris (Ph.D.)
- Occupations: Sociologist, historian
- Years active: 1952–1975
- Employer: Ferdowsi University of Mashhad
- Organization: Hosseiniye Ershad
- Political party: Freedom Movement of Iran
- Spouse: Pouran Shariat-Razavi
- Children: 4

Ali Shariati Mazinani (Note: Persian: علی شریعتی مزینانی, romanized: Alī Šaria’tī Mazīnânī) (23 November 1933 – 18 June 1977) was an Iranian revolutionary and sociologist who specialised in the sociology of religion. He is regarded as one of the most influential Iranian intellectuals of the 20th century. He has been referred to as the "ideologue of the Islamic Revolution", although his ideas did not ultimately serve as the foundation for the Islamic Republic. The work and ideas associated with Shariati are known as Shariatism, which proposed a progressive interpretation of Shia Islam.

== Biography ==
Ali Shariati, also known as Ali Masharati, was born in 1933 in Mazinan, a suburb of Sabzevar in northeastern Persia. His father's family were clerics. His father, Mohammad-Taqi, was a teacher and Islamic scholar. In 1947, he established the Centre for the Propagation of Islamic Truth in Mashhad, Khorasan Province. It was a social Islamic forum that became involved in the oil nationalisation movement of the 1950s. Shariati's mother came from a small land-owning family in Sabzevar, a town near Mashhad.

During his years at the Teacher's Training College in Mashhad, Shariati encountered young individuals from economically disadvantaged backgrounds and for the first time witnessed the poverty and hardships prevalent in Iran at that time. At the same time, he was exposed to many aspects of Western philosophical and political thought. He attempted to explain and offer solutions for the problems faced by Muslim societies through traditional Islamic principles interwoven with, and understood from, the point of view of modern sociology and philosophy. His articles from this period for the Mashhad daily newspaper, Khorasan, display his developing eclecticism and acquaintance with the ideas of modernist thinkers such as Jamal al-Din al-Afghani and Sir Allama Muhammad Iqbal among the Muslim community, and Sigmund Freud and Alexis Carrel.

In 1952, Shariati became a high school teacher and founded the Islamic Students' Association, which led to his arrest following a demonstration. In 1953, the year of Mossadeq's overthrow, he became a member of the National Front. He received his bachelor's degree from the University of Mashhad in 1955. In 1957, he was arrested again by the Iranian police, along with fifteen other members of the National Resistance Movement.

Shariati then earned a scholarship to continue his graduate studies at the University of Paris under the supervision of the Iranist Gilbert Lazard. He left Paris after earning a PhD in Persian language in 1964. According to Ali Rahnema, the Paris to which Shariati arrived in the 1960s was "the world's hub of cultural and political activity", particularly in terms of anti-colonial resistance in the context of the Algerian Revolution. During this period in Paris, Shariati started collaborating with the Algerian National Liberation Front (FLN) in 1959. The following year, he began to read Frantz Fanon and translated an anthology of his work into Persian. Shariati introduced Fanon's thought into Iranian revolutionary émigré circles. He was arrested in Paris on 17 January 1961 during a demonstration in honour of Patrice Lumumba.

The same year he joined Ebrahim Yazdi, Mostafa Chamran and Sadegh Qotbzadeh in founding the Freedom Movement of Iran abroad. In 1962, he continued studying sociology and the history of religions in Paris and followed the courses of Islamic scholar Louis Massignon, Jacques Berque and the sociologist Georges Gurvitch. He also came to know the philosopher Jean-Paul Sartre that same year, and published Jalal Al-e Ahmad's book Gharbzadegi (or Occidentosis) in Iran.

Shariati then returned to Iran in 1964, where he was arrested and imprisoned for engaging in subversive political activities while in France. He was released after a few weeks, at which point he began teaching at the University of Mashhad. Shariati went to Tehran, where he began lecturing at the Hosseiniye Ershad Institute. These lectures were hugely popular among his students and were spread by word of mouth throughout all economic sectors of society, including the middle and upper classes, where interest in his teachings began to grow. His continued success again aroused the interest of the government. Shariati was arrested, along with many of his students. Widespread pressure from the people and an international outcry eventually led to his release on 20 March 1975, after eighteen months in solitary confinement.

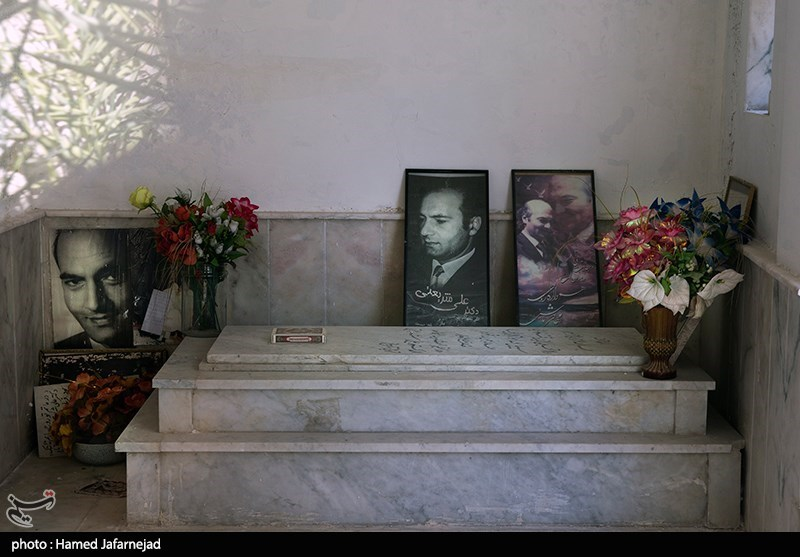
The tomb of Shariati

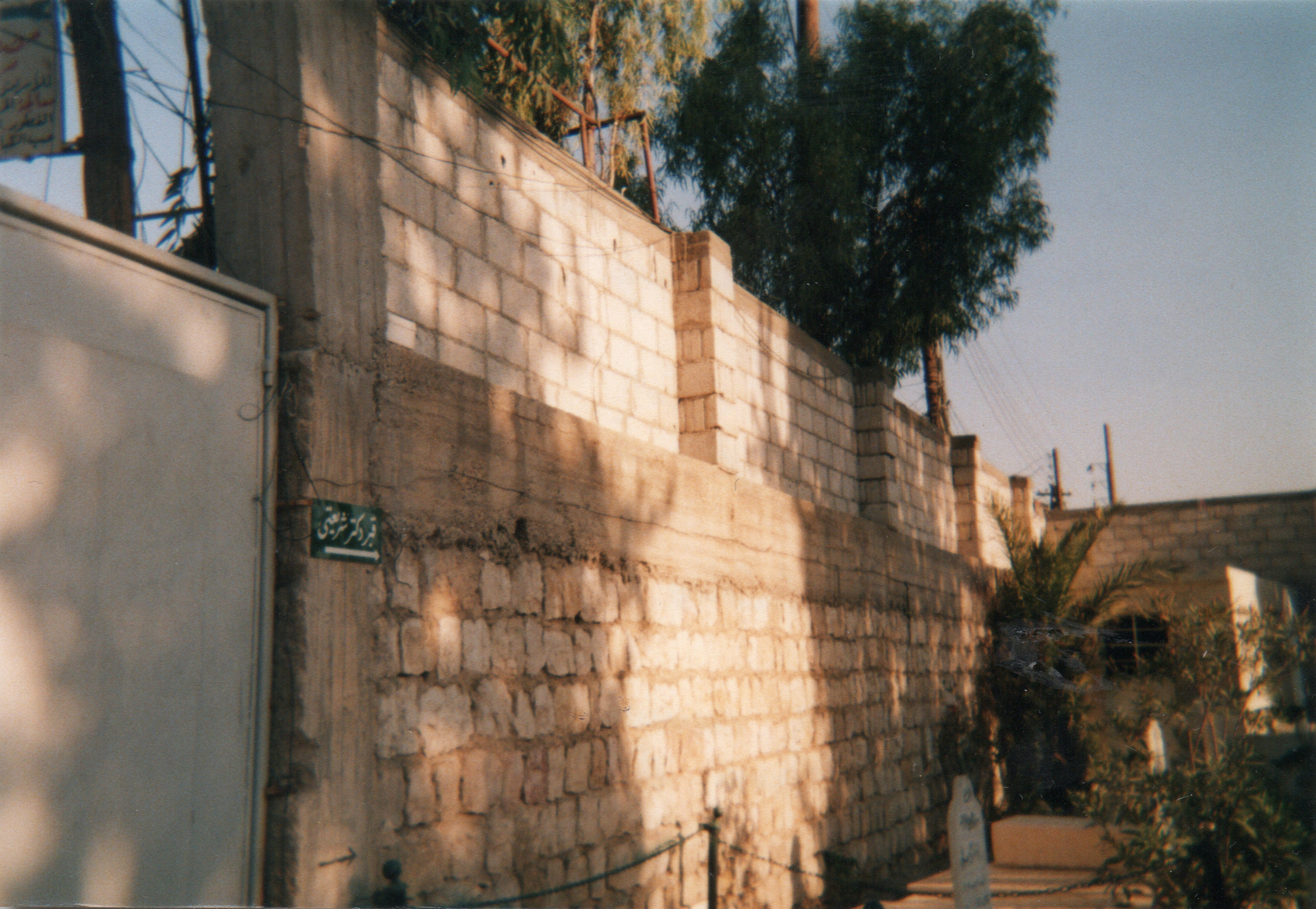
The mausoleum of Shariati in 2001

Shariati was allowed to leave for the United Kingdom. Shortly after, on 18 June 1977, he was found dead in Southampton at the house he was renting from psychology professor Doctor Butterworth. He is believed to have been killed by the SAVAK, the Iranian security service during the time of the Shah. However, in Ali Rahnema's biography of Shariati, he is said to have died of a heart attack under mysterious circumstances, although no hospital or medical records have been found. He is buried in Damascus next to Sayyidah Zaynab, the granddaughter of the Islamic prophet Muhammad and the daughter of Ali. Iranian pilgrims often visit his grave.

== Views and popularity ==
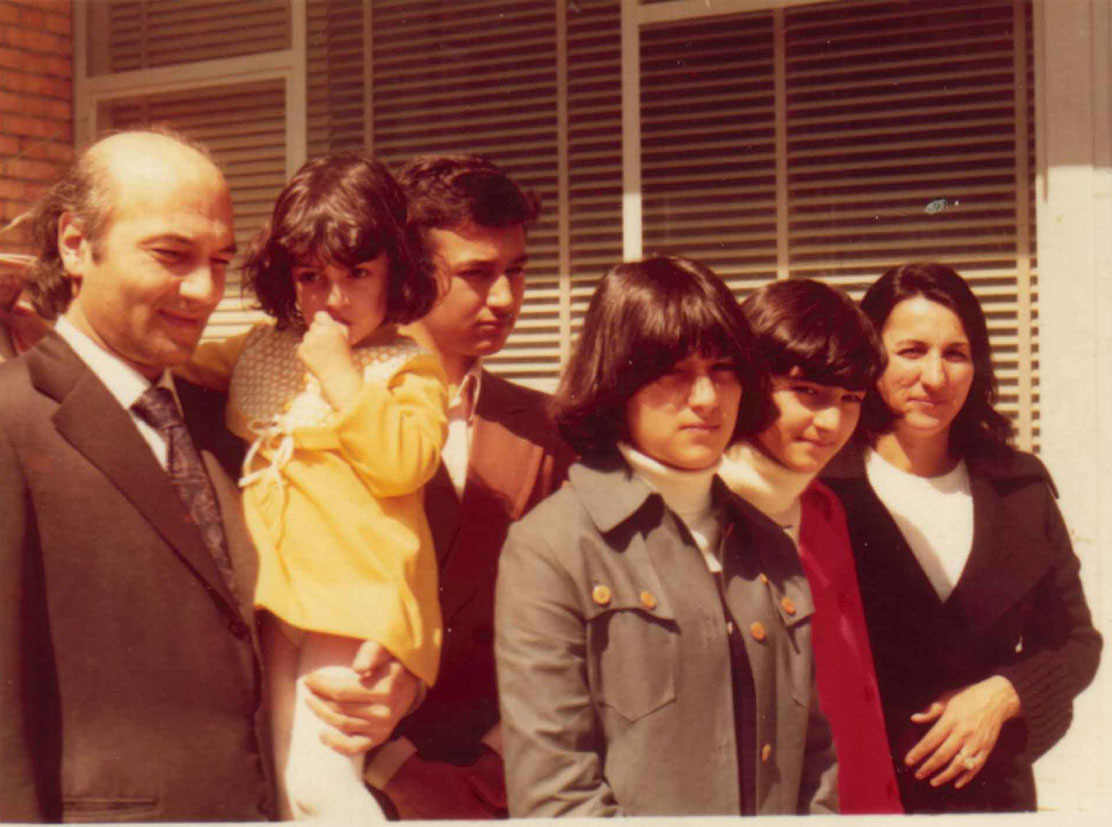
Shariati and his family one day after his release from prison

Shariati sought to revive the revolutionary currents of Shi'ism. His interpretation of Shi'ism encouraged revolution in the world and promised salvation after death. He referred to his brand of Shiism as "red Shiism" or Alid Shiism which he contrasted with non-revolutionary "black Shiism" or Safavid Shiism. His ideas have been compared to the Catholic Liberation Theology movement founded in South America by Peruvian Gustavo Gutierrez and Brazilian Leonardo Boff.

Shariati was a prominent philosopher of Islam, who argued that a good society would conform to Islamic values. As opposed to other prominent revolutionary figures, such as Ayatollah Khomeini, Shariati proposed a utopian classless society that would be established through a dialectical struggle between the people of tawhid (monotheism) and the people of shirk (polytheism). He argued that it was only in a classless society that true monotheism could be established, and the dialectical struggle between these two dual forms of humanity were idealized for him in the struggle between Cain and Abel.

Shariati believed that the most learned members of the Ulema (clergy) should play a leadership role in guiding society because they best understand how to administer an Islamic value system based on the teachings of the prophets of God and the 12 Shia Twelver Imams. He argued that the role of the clergy was to guide society under Islamic values to advance human beings towards reaching their highest potential, rather than to provide or serve the hedonistic desires of individuals as in the West. However, Shariati did not believe that the clergy should themselves be rulers and that society should be dominated by the ulema, the view popularized by Ayatollah Khomieni in his concept of vilayat al-faqih, or "guardianship of the jurists". Rather, he argued that the clergy should play a role in electing a ruler who could lead the people according to the principles of Islam.

At the same time, Shariati was very critical of some clerics and defended the Marxists. "Our mosques, the revolutionary left and our preachers", he declared, "work for the benefit of the deprived people and against the lavish and lush [...] Our clerics who teach jurisprudence and issue fatwas are right-wingers, capitalist, and conservative; simply our fiqh is at the service of capitalism." For Shariati, "Safavid Shiism", which he described as the religion propagated by the ulema, was devoid of the "true" and revolutionary roots of Islam brought forth by Muhammad and Ali that challenged the authority of the elite in Mecca, namely that of the Umayyads. He argued that "Safavid Shiism" had taken on an apolitical character as an arm of the state, and had corrupted the original revolutionary message of Islam and Shiism, which he refers to as "Alid Shiism". His resentment and criticism of the clergy was, and continues to be, a point of controversy, as many of the ulema vehemently disagreed with his arguments.

Shariati's works were highly influenced by Louis Massignon and the Third Worldism that he encountered as a student in Paris, including ideas that class war and revolution would bring about a just and classless society. He was also highly influenced by the epistemic decolonisation thinking of his time. He is said to have adopted the idea of Gharbzadegi from Jalal Al-e Ahmad and given it "its most vibrant and influential second life". He sought to translate these ideas into cultural symbols of Shiism that Iranians could relate to. Shariati believed Shia should not only await the return of the 12th Imam, but should actively work to hasten his return by fighting for social justice "even to the point of embracing martyrdom". He said that "every day is Ashoura, every place is the Karbala".

Shariati is sometimes referred to as the "Fanon of the Islamic Revolution"; unlike Fanon, however, Shariati viewed religion (specifically Islam and Shiism) as an ideology in itself that could be used to politically and socially mobilize people in anti-colonial resistance and revolution. In his lecture "Shiism: A Complete Party", Shariati argued that the Shia sect of Islam contained in it a revolutionary ideology and was itself the "party of God", with the ability to mobilize the masses in a "class struggle". This also formed the basis for his lecture series on Islamshensi or "Islamology", which he delivered from the Hosseiniye Ershad Institute from February to November 1972. This was Shariati's attempt to reinterpret and reconceptualize Islam through a revolutionary lens, constructing Islam as more than just a religion, but a universalist political ideology, recasting Islamic history as inherently transformative, progressive, and resistant. He felt that people could fight imperialism solely by recovering their cultural identity. In some countries, such an identity was intertwined with fundamental religious beliefs. Shariati refers to the maxim of returning to ourselves.

Drawing directly from Fanon, in his lectures titled Bāzgasht or "Return", Shariati presented his own version of a "return to self" that was rooted in a revival of the ethical and spiritual core of a community, arguing for a return to the "culture of Islam" and Islamic ideology. Fanon's return to self (described in his works Black Skin, White Masks and in The Wretched of the Earth) is based on a present return and reclamation of one's identity through acts of violence that affirm the existing body and selfhood in the present moment beyond the racialized identities imposed by colonizers, which he argues is a direct and immediate act of decolonization and liberation. In contrast, Shariati's "return" is future-oriented in that it shifts the focus from the immediate present to a potential future state of self and society, one that is rooted in Islamic values and focuses on the rediscovery of a religious self. Shariati's concept of "return" is closely tied to martyrdom (shahadat), in which the martyr willingly commits an act of self-sacrifice in order to awaken the collective consciousness of the community against oppression. He relies on the martyrdom of Husain, who represents the ideal martyr who willingly chose to sacrifice himself to realize a return to an authentic Islam for others.

Social theorist Asef Bayat has recorded his observations as a witness and participant in the Iranian revolution of 1979. He asserts that Shariati emerged at the time of the revolution as "an unparalleled revolutionary intellectual" with his portraits widely present during the marches and protests. His nickname as "mo'allem-e enqilab" ("revolutionary mentor") was chanted by millions, and his literature and tapes had already been widely available before the revolution. Bayat recalls that "[his] father, barely literate, had his own copies" of Shariati's works.

=== On the role of women ===
In Expectations from the Muslim Woman, also called Our Expectations of the Muslim Woman, first given in 1975, Shariati discusses women's rights in Islam. The point of his lecture is not to show that women's rights do not exist in Islam, but to show that what Shariati saw as anti-Islamic traditions have had tragic results for Muslim women. He uses Fatima, the daughter of Muhammad, as an example of a woman who played a significant role in political life.

He begins his lecture by stating that:

Most often, we are satisfied by pointing out that Islam gives great value to science or establishes progressive rights for women. Unfortunately we never actually use or benefit from this value or these rights.

He continues by stating that:

From the 18th through to the 20th century (particularly after World War 2) any attempt to address the special problem of the social rights of women and their specific characteristics has been seen as a mere by-product of a spiritual or psychic shock or the result of a revolutionary crisis in centers of learning or as a response to political currents and international movements. Thus, traditional societies, historical societies, religious societies, either in the East or in the West (be they tribal, Bedouin, civilized Muslim or non-Muslim societies, in whatever social or cultural stage of civilization they may be) have all been directly or indirectly influenced by these thoughts, intellectual currents and even new social realities.

He argues that the liberation of women has begun in the West, and many fear it occurring in the Muslim world. In part because they are misinformed, and have not looked at Islam through a historical perspective, and are relying on their misinterpretation of Islam:

In such societies the newly-educated class, the pseudo-intellectuals, who are in the majority, strongly and vigorously welcome this crisis. They themselves even act as one of the forces that strengthen this corrupting and destructive transformation.

Shariati believed that women in Iran under the Shah were only sexually liberated and did not have any social freedom. He attributed this in part to the "rather bourgeois cognition" and in part to the Freudian ideal of sexual liberation. To Shariati, Freud was an agent of the bourgeoisie:

Up to the appearance of Freud (who was one of the agents of the bourgeoisie), it was through the liberal bourgeois spirit that scientific sexualism was manifested. It must be taken into consideration that the bourgeoisie is always an inferior class.

He concludes that a scholar or scientist who lives, thinks, and studies during the bourgeois age, measures collective, cultural, and spiritual values based on the economy, production and consumption.

=== Shariati and progressive movement in Iran ===
Ali Shariati was characterized as a progressive thinker. Political theorist Siavash Saffari argues that Shariati and the intellectual tradition that developed around him advanced a "sociopolitically progressive discourse of indigenous modernity". His ideas combined Islam with modernity, drawing on progressive elements of Western political thought.

Shariati's progressivism was mostly expressed through his emphasis on social justice, equality and the liberation of oppressed groups. His use of the Qur'anic concept of the mostazafin ("the oppressed") became an important part of his political thought. Shariati also sought to reinterpret Islam as a force for social and political emancipation, while seeking a form of social and political change grounded in Islamic intellectual traditions. Shariati engaged with Marxist thought and anti-colonial writers such as Frantz Fanon, using elements of these ideologies in his attempt to formulate an alternative Islamic conception of modernity.

=== Shariati and socialism ===
It seems that his eagerness to explore socialism began with the translation of the book Abu Zarr: The God-Worshipping Socialist by Egyptian Abdul Hamid Jowdat-al-Sahar. According to this book, Abu Dhar was the very first socialist. Then, Shariati's father declared that his son believed that the principles of Abu Dhar are fundamental. Some described Shariati as the modern Abu Dhar in Iran. Of all his thoughts, there is his insistence on the necessity of revolutionary action. Shariati believed that Marxism could not provide the Third World with the ideological means for its own liberation. One of his premises was that Islam by nature is a revolutionary ideology. Therefore, Islam could relate to the modern world as an ideology.

According to Shariati, the historical and original origin of human problems was the emergence of private ownership. He believed that in the modern era, the appearance of the machine was the second most fundamental change in the human condition. Private ownership and the emergence of the machine, if considered one of two curves of history, belong to the second period of history. The first period is collective ownership. However, Shariati gave a critique of the historical development of religion and the modern philosophical and ideological movements and their relationship to both private ownership and the emergence of the machine.

==== Epistemology ====
Shariati developed the idea of the social, cultural and historical contingencies of religious knowledge in sociology. He believed in the earthly religion and the social context in which the meaning of society is construed. He also emphasised that he understood religion historically because he was a sociologist. He said he was concerned with the historical and social Tawhid, not with the truth of the Quran or of Muhammad or Ali.

== Sociology ==
Some scholars classify him among the current religious neo-thinkers. According to this standpoint, Shariati accepted the rationality of the West. Shariati called the theoretical foundation of the West civilisation and called its appearances Tajadod (renewal). He emphasised accepting civilisation and criticised Tajadod. He also believed that civilisation has to be considered as something deep. He also highly acknowledged the importance of empirical science and knowledge. He appreciated the empirical methodology and criticised traditionalism for its disregard for scientific methodology. On another hand, he criticised the Modernists because they confuse the Western ideological theories with valid scientific epistemology. According to Shariati, the knowledge of reason is self-evident. Therefore, he suggested thinking of reason as the axiom for understanding the other sources, namely the holy book or Quran, ḥadīth (tradition), sīra (prophetic biography) and ijmāʿ (consensus). Shariati also dismissed consensus as a source for understanding religion. He insisted on the concepts of knowledge and time along with the holy book and tradition, and stressed the important role of methodology and changing of viewpoint.

Shariati, who was a fan of Georges Gurvitch in his analysis of sociology, believed that there was no special pattern for the analysis of social affairs and historical events. He thought that there was no unity of religion and society, but rather there were many religions and societies. He referred to the active role of the scholar of human science during investigation and scientific research. He believed that there was a relationship between the values of scholarship and the effects of those values on the conclusions of an investigation. He believed that it was not necessary to extend the other conclusions of other Western scholars to Iranian society. However, he criticised the Western ideological schools, including nationalism, liberalism and Marxism. He maintained that there was conformity and correspondence between Western philosophy and Iranian society. According to Shariati, democracy is inconsistent with revolutionary evolution and progress. One of his criticisms of Western ideology is its imitation of those ideologies. One of his other criticisms is the denial of spirituality in Western philosophy. Those ideologies attempt to prevent humans from achieving transcendental goals and any evolutionary movements. In this vein, he firmly criticised capitalism, and at the same time he admired socialism because it would lead humanity to evolution and free it from utilitarianism. However, he firmly criticised Karl Marx. According to Shariati, Marx's theory on the economy as the infrastructure and foundation of humanity and society was incorrect. Conversely, Sharia places the human, not the economy, as the foundation and origin of society.

== Modern problems ==
Shariati saw human history as composed of two stages: the stage of collectivity and the stage of private ownership. He explained that the first stage, collectivity, was concerned with social equality and spiritual oneness. The second stage, which is the current era, could be considered as the domination of the many by one. The second stage began with the emergence of private ownership. Various types of private ownership in history have included slavery, serfdom, feudalism and capitalism—among others. According to the concept of social ownership, all material and spiritual resources are accessible to everyone, but monopolies polarised the human community. According to Shariati, private ownership is the main cause of all modern problems. These problems change men's brotherhood and love to duplicity, deceit, hatred, exploitation, colonisation and massacre. This polarisation has manifested itself in different forms throughout history. For example, in ancient times, there were slave economies that transitioned to capitalist societies in modern times. Machinism, or the dependence on machines, can be considered the latest stage of private ownership. Machinism began in the nineteenth century, and human beings have had to confront the many anxieties and problems arising from it.

== Legacy ==
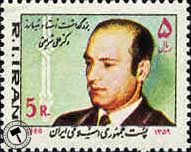
1980 Iranian stamp honoring Shariati

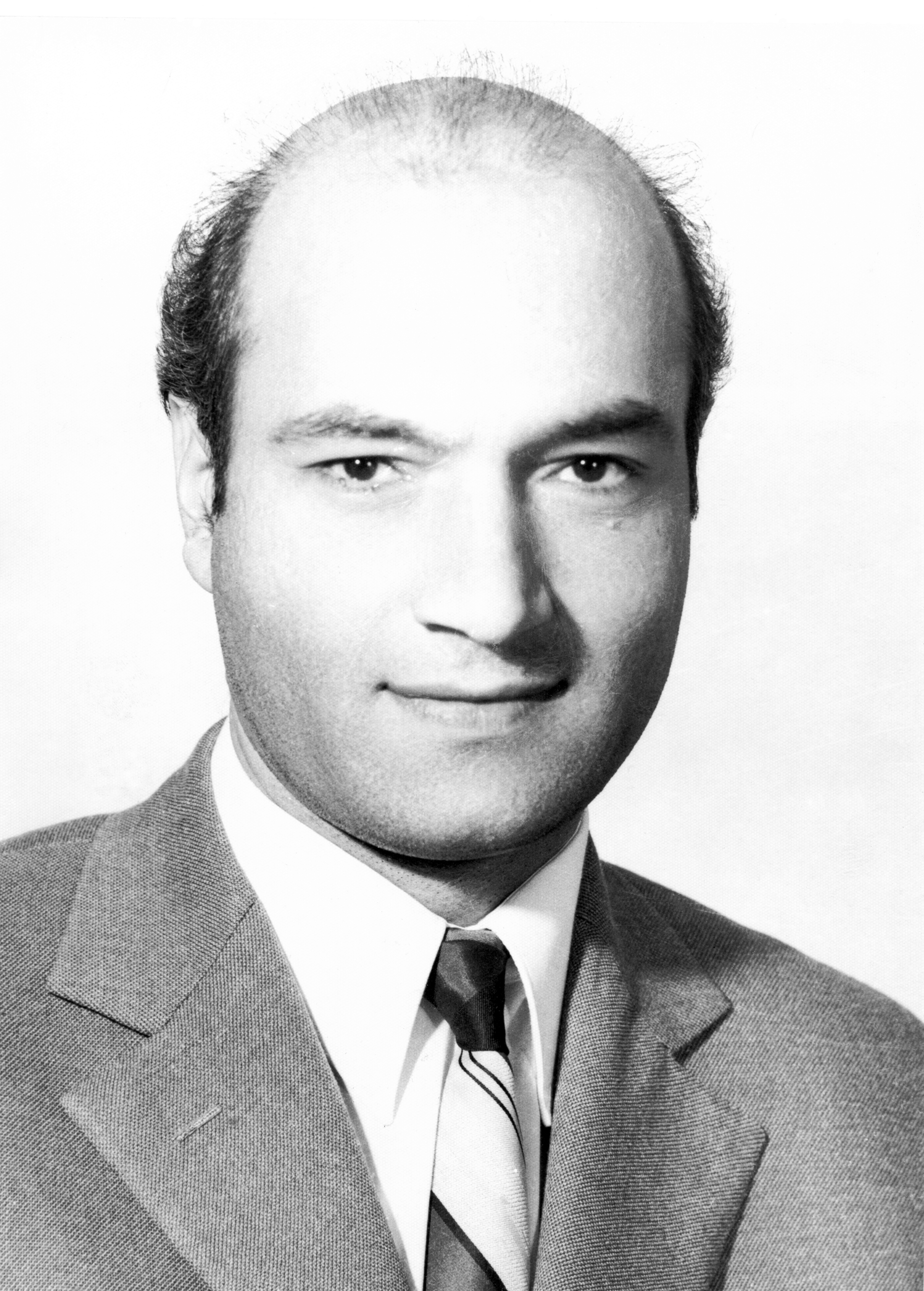
Portrait of Ali Shariati Mazinani

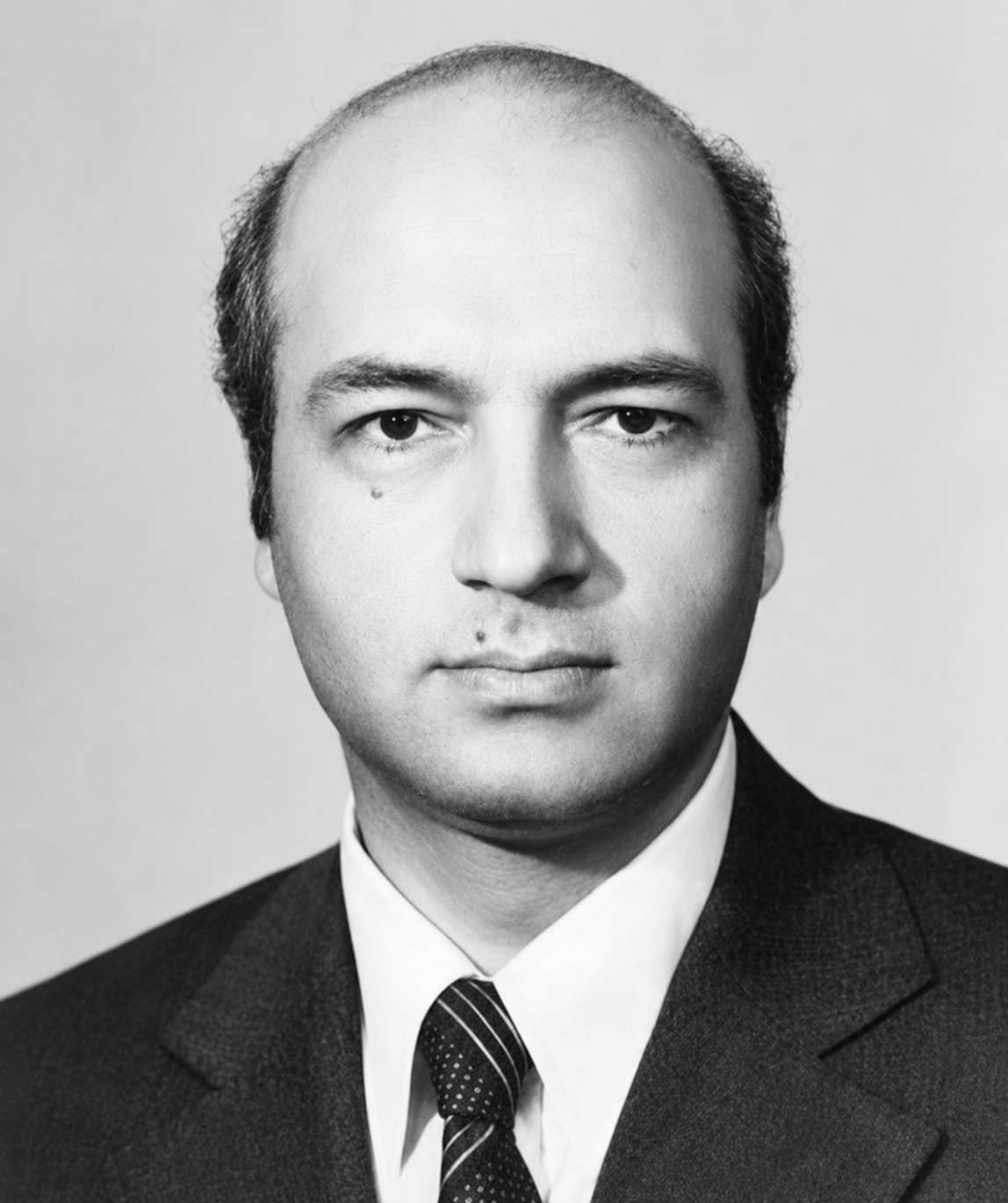

There are many adherents and opponents of Shariati's views, and Shariati's personality is largely unknown. Ali Khamenei knew Shariati as a pioneer of Islamic teaching according to the requirements of his generation. According to Sayyed Ali Khamenei, Shariati had both positive and negative characteristics. Khamenei believed that it was unfair to consider Shariati as someone who firmly disagreed with the Mullahs. One of the positive sides of Shariati was his ability to explain his thoughts with suitable and simple language for his generation. Shariati was somewhat supportive of Mullahs in Iran. Some scholars like Elizabeth F. Thompson try to envisage some similarities between Shariati and his role in the Islamic revolution in Iran with Sayyed Qutb's role in Egypt. One similarity is that both paved the way for the imminent revolution in their countries. Both desired Islamic cultural dominance. Both were fans of being revolutionary about ruling values and norms. They considered Islamism a third way between those of America and the Soviet Union. At the same time, they were not wholly utopian, and they were partly Islamic. Of course, there are differences between them, for example, Shariati was a leftist while Qutb was a conservative. According to Mahmoud Taleghani, Shariati was a thinker who created a school for revolution. The school guided young people to revolutionary action. Beheshti believes that Shariati's work was fundamental to the Islamic revolution.

According to Hamid Enayat, Shariati was not only a theorist but also an adherent of Islamic radicalism. Enayat believes that Shariati can be considered the founder of Islamic socialism. Enayat considers him one of the most beloved and popular individuals in Islamic radicalism and socialism.

According to Hamid Algar, Shariati was the number one ideologue of the Islamic revolution.

== Publications ==
Despite Shariati's early death, he authored some 200 publications including articles, seminar papers and lecture series in addition to more than a hundred books.

=== Major works ===
- Hajj (The Pilgrimage)
- Hubut in Kavir
- Guftuguhaye Tanha’i
- Marxism and Other Western Fallacies: An Islamic Critique
- Where Shall We Begin?
- Mission of a Free Thinker
- The Free Man and Freedom of the Man
- Extraction and Refinement of Cultural Resources
- Martyrdom (book)
- Ali
- An approach to Understanding Islam
- A Visage of Prophet Muhammad
- A Glance of Tomorrow's History
- Reflections of Humanity
- A Manifestation of Self-Reconstruction and Reformation
- Selection and/or Election
- Norouz, Declaration of Iranian's Livelihood, Eternity
- Expectations from the Muslim Woman
- Horr (Battle of Karbala)
- Kavir (Desert)
- Abu-Dahr
- Red Shi'ism vs. Black Shi'ism
- Jihad and Shahadat
- Reflections of a Concerned Muslim on the Plight of Oppressed People
- A Message to the Enlightened Thinkers
- Art Awaiting the Saviour
- Fatemeh is Fatemeh
- The Philosophy of Supplication
- Religion versus Religion
- Man and Islam – see chapter "Modern Man and His Prisons"
- Arise and Bear Witness
- Lessons on Islamology
- Ali is Alone
- Community and Leadership
- Religion against Religion
- We and Iqbal
- Historical Determinism
- What is to be Done?
- "The Intelligentsia's Task for Reconstruction of Society"
- Ba Mukhatabhaye Ashna

=== Other works ===
- Hegel und Ali Shariati: Geschichtsphilosophische Betrachtungen im Geiste der islamischen Revolution im Iran doi:10.1515/hgjb-2014-0158
- Paradox as Decolonization: Ali Shariati's Islamic Lawgiver doi:10.1177/0090591720977804

=== Translation ===
Shariati translated many books into Persian. Besides the work of Abu Zarr mentioned above, he translated Jean-Paul Sartre's What Is Literature? and Che Guevara's Guerrilla Warfare. He also began to work on the translation of Franz Fanon's A Dying Colonialism. He admired Amar Ouzegane as a major Marxist Muslim and began to translate his book Le meilleur combat (The Best Struggle).

Many scholars have contended with the nature of Shariati's translations and the manner in which he viewed and presented the ideas of others, vis-à-vis his view of himself as a rawshanfikr, roughly translating to intellectual or enlightened. Scholars who have studied Shariati and his works, such as Ali Rahnema, Georg Leube, and Arash Davari, have considered the liberties, "fictive" elements, and "true lies" which Shariati deployed in his translations and transmissions of others' ideas. These scholars argue that Shariati strategically conveyed the ideas and thoughts of intellectual contemporaries outside of Iran, such as Frantz Fanon, in a manner that would best suit his audience in Iran, molding his presentation to deliver the greatest impact while maintaining the "spirit" of the message.

== See also ==
- Intellectual Movements in Iran
- Islamic Marxism
- Islamic revival
- List of Islamic scholars
- Philosophy in Iran
- Red Shi'ism vs. Black Shi'ism
- Religious Intellectualism in Iran
- Jalal Al-e-Ahmad
- Hamid Algar
- Geydar Dzhemal, a modern philosopher of political Islam, revolutionist and social activist
- Abdulaziz Sachedina, a student of Shariati
- Alevi, also called Red Head Alevi Shiites.
