= Mariella Ourghi =

Mariella Ourghi (1972 in Tirschenreuth- November 14, 2015) was an Islamic scholar.

== Career ==
Since completing her doctorate in Islamic Studies at the University of Freiburg, she was a lecturer in Islamic studies. Her main research interests were Islamism (especially jihadist movements) and legitimation of violence, eschatology in modern Islam and Twelve Shiite state concepts.

== Books ==
- Muslimische Positionen Zur Berechtigung Von Gewalt: Einzelstimmen, Revisionen, Kontroversen (Bibliotheca Academica - Reihe Orientalistik), 2010
- Schiitischer Messianismus Und Mahdi-Glaube in Der Neuzeit (Mitteilungen Zur Sozial- Und Kulturgeschichte der Islamische), 2008
