= Pierre Roche (sculptor) =

French painter

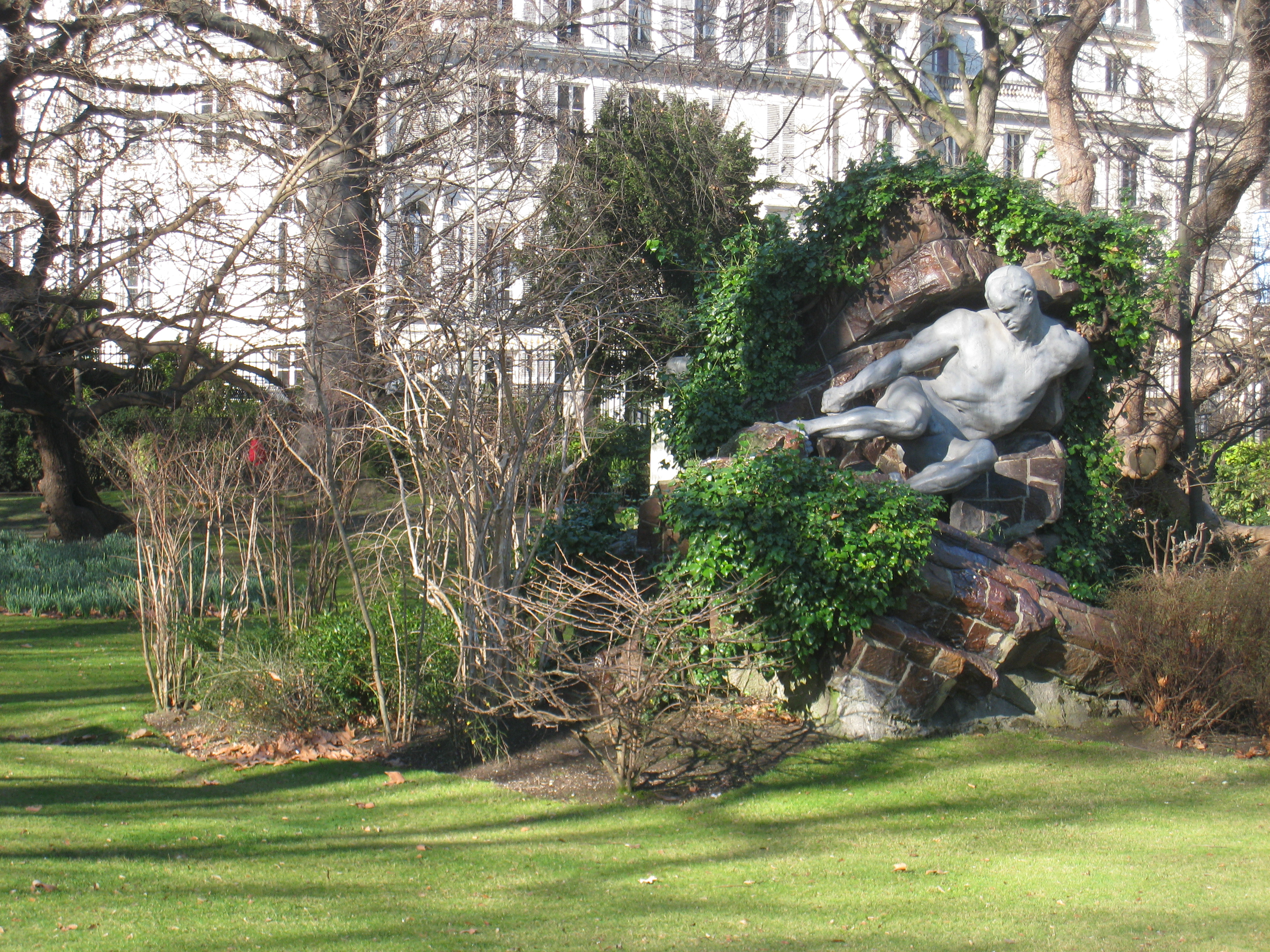
L'Effort, by Pierre Roche, Jardin du Luxembourg.

Pierre Roche (Paris, 2 August 1855 – Paris, 18 January 1922), pseudonym of Pierre Henry Ferdinand Massignon, was a French sculptor, painter, ceramist and medallist. He was the father to Louis Massignon.

Roche first studied medicine and chemistry in Paris, but then switched to studying painting at the Académie Julian 1873–1878 under Alfred Roll, and exhibited at the Paris Salon 1884–1889.

In 1888 Roche tried sculpture to compete for a monument to Georges Danton, leading to encouragement by sculptor and teacher Jules Dalou. He went on to produce a number of commissioned works, like the fountain April (1906) in the Musée Galliera gardens, and L'Effort (c.1898) in the Jardin du Luxembourg. He is credited as the inventor of gypsotypie, a technique of relief printing.

His works are collected in the Musée d'Orsay, Fine Arts Museums of San Francisco, Courtauld Institute of Art, and Harvard University Art Museums.
