= Louis Massignon =

Catholic scholar of Islam

- Born: 25 July 1883; Nogent-sur-Marne, France
- Died: 31 October 1962 (aged 79)
- Title: Chair of Muslim Sociology and Sociography
- Spouse: Marcelle Dansaert-Testelin
- Children: Geneviève Massignon

Academic background
- Education: Lycée Louis-le-Grand
- Alma mater: Collège de France

Academic work
- Discipline: Oriental studies
- Sub-discipline: Arab and Islamic studies
- Institutions: Collège de France
- Notable works: Annuaire du Monde Musulman; La passion de Hussayn Ibn Mansûr an-Hallâj

Louis Massignon (25 July 1883 – 31 October 1962) was a French Catholic scholar of Islam and a pioneer of Catholic-Muslim mutual understanding. He was an influential figure in the twentieth century with regard to the Catholic Church's relationship with Islam and played a role in Islam being accepted as an Abrahamic faith among Catholics.

Although a Catholic himself, he tried to understand Islam from within and thus had a great influence on the way Islam was seen in the West; among other things, he paved the way for a greater openness to dialogue inside the Catholic Church towards Islam. Some scholars maintain that his research, esteem for Islam and Muslims, and cultivation of key students in Islamic studies largely prepared the way for the positive vision of Islam articulated in the Lumen gentium and the Nostra aetate at the Second Vatican Council.

== Life ==
Louis Massignon was born in Nogent-sur-Marne near Paris, France. His father, Fernand Massignon (1855–1922), a painter and a sculptor under the pseudonym Pierre Roche, was an intimate friend of novelist Joris-Karl Huysmans. Whereas his father was a religious skeptic, his mother, Marie Hovyn Massignon, had a deep prayer life and was his earliest and foremost religious influence. Huysmans' own conversion to Roman Catholicism was one of the first major inspirations of the young Louis in a friendly tutorial relationship that lasted from 1901 till Huysmans' death in 1907.

=== Studies ===
Louis Massignon started his studies at the Lycée Louis-le-Grand in Paris (1896) where he befriended his classmate Henri Maspero, later a renowned sinologist. Following his baccalauréat (1901) he went on a first trip to Algeria where his family had relations, and ties with high colonial officers: Henry de Vialar, Henry de Castries, and Alfred Le Chatelier, the founder of the Chair of Muslim Sociology at the Collège de France in Paris.

In 1902, he continued his studies, graduating licencié ès-lettres on an essay on Honoré d'Urfé and embarking on the first of his many Arab subjects: the corporations of Fez in the 15th century. Exploring the sources of his study in Morocco in 1904, he vowed to dedicate himself to the study of Arabic after a dangerous confrontation in the desert. In 1906, he received his diplôme d'études supérieures on the strength of his study.

=== Conversion to Christianity ===
In 1907, he was sent on an archeological mission to Mesopotamia. In Baghdad he was the guest of the great Muslim family of the Alusi, who introduced him to the brand of Arab hospitality he was to honour throughout his life. It was the Alusi who saved him from a very dangerous situation in the desert when in 1908—during the ferment of the Young Turk Revolution—he was captured as a "spy" and almost killed. (The Alusi also helped him gather the sources for his magnum opus on the 10th-century mystic al-Hallaj.)

This situation of captivity, and the experience of Muslim spirituality, also brought about his conversion to Christianity: In mortal danger, which filled him with extreme, physical anguish, he first felt remorse for his past life, made an abortive and tentative suicide attempt, fell into a delirium and a state of great agitation (later diagnosed as either malaria, or a stroke caused by sun and fatigue), and finally experienced the presence of God as a "visitation of a Stranger", who overwhelmed him, leaving him passive and helpless, feeling judged for having judged others harshly, and almost making him lose his very sense of identity. Yet he also experienced this visitation as a liberation from his (outer) captivity, and a promise that he was going to return to Paris. He himself interpreted the state of delirium as a "reaction of [his] brain to the forced conversion of [his] soul".

He recovered rapidly from his illness, had a second spiritual experience and travelled to Beirut accompanied by the Iraqi priest Anastase-Marie al-Karmali (Anastasius-Maria the Carmelite), with whom Massignon became friends. In Beirut, Massignon made a confession to Father Anastase-Marie, thus confirming his conversion to Catholicism. The priest eventually escorted Massignon all the way to Brittany and met his parents before returning to Baghdad. Louis and Father Anastase-Marie would maintain a correspondence until 1936.

Massignon strongly felt that he was assisted in his encounter with God and in his conversion by the intercession of living and deceased friends, among them Joris-Karl Huysmans and Charles de Foucauld (1858–1916), who had also experienced God in a Muslim context. Thus, his conversion provided a firm basis for his lifelong association with the latter. He made Massignon the executor of his spiritual legacy: the Directoire—the Rule for the foundation of the Little Brothers of Jesus, which Louis Massignon duly saw to publication in 1928 after a long hesitation by the Church authorities over the imprimatur.

However, Massignon did not follow Foucauld's invitation to join him in his life as a hermit among the Tuareg in Tamanrasset. Instead, on 27 January 1914, he married a cousin, Marcelle Dansaert-Testelin. His daughter was the linguist and ethnographer, Geneviève Massignon.

=== Activities in World War I ===
During World War I he was a translating officer for the 2ème Bureau (the French Intelligence) at the headquarters of the 17th French Colonial Division, in which capacity he was affected to the Sykes-Picot mission (1917) as a temporary captain acting on his experience as an Arabist and an Islamist, after a spell of his own volition as an infantry second lieutenant at the Macedonian front (1916), where he was twice mentioned in dispatches and awarded a medal for bravery.

Within this mission, he became acquainted with T. E. Lawrence in August 1917 in Cairo and apparently there had been plans to attach Massignon to the Arab Legion, an Arab force who had rallied to Sharif Husain's revolt and were trained by the British and French. He had several friendly interviews with Lawrence, among others on the Handbook for Arabia, which served as an example for his own Annuaire du Monde Musulman. They both shared the same sense of honour and betrayal after the collapse of the Arab-Anglo-French relationship on the disclosure of the 1917 Balfour Declaration. Massignon does not figure among the friends in Lawrence's published letters, which does not mean that Lawrence did not take an intellectual interest in the subsequent contributions to Arabism by Massignon since, it will be remembered he had started his own career as a keen Francophile.

=== Scholarly work after World War I ===
On 15 June 1919 Massignon was provisionally appointed to the Chair of Muslim Sociology and Sociography at the Collège de France in Paris. In January 1926, Massignon was finally given the chair in January 1926, when the creator of the chair and incumbent, Alfred le Chatelier retired. He conducted research on various subjects related to Islam, such as the lives of al-Hallaj, Muhammad's companion Salman Pak and the significance of Abraham for the three Abrahamic religions. Since 1911, he had edited a journal on Islamic world, Revue du monde musulman.

His four-volume doctoral thesis on al-Hallaj, finished in 1914, was published in 1922. He continued to work on the life of the mystic for the rest of his life and showed the importance of al-Hallaj as figure in Muslim spirituality as reflected also in intellectual discussions, art, poetry and legends. It was criticized by many as giving prominence to a relatively marginal figure in Islam: especially sharp criticism appears in Edward Said's Orientalism. Likewise, his great openness for Islam was seen with sceptical eyes by many Catholics.

=== Religious commitments ===
In the 1930s, Francis of Assisi played a great role in his life: In 1931, Massignon became a Franciscan tertiary and took the name of "Ibrahim" (due to the hospitality of Abraham to the angels). On 9 February 1934, he and Mary Kahil, a friend from his youth, prayed at the abandoned Franciscan church of Damietta, Egypt, where Francis of Assisi had met Sultan al-Malik al-Kamil in 1219. They took a vow of Badaliya ('substitution'), offering their lives for the Muslims, "not so they would be converted, but so that the will of God might be accomplished in them and through them". This vow led to the formal foundation of the Badaliya prayer association in 1947, first in Cairo and then in Paris. Especially after the 9/11 attacks, Badaliya prayer groups were also established in Boston and Washington, D.C.

Encouraged by Mary Kahil and with the permission of Pope Pius XII, he became a Melkite Greek Catholic on 5 February 1949, which meant he still remained in the Catholic Church, but was no longer affiliated with the Roman Rite. Instead the Melkite Church consists of Arab Catholics and its Byzantine Rite liturgy is celebrated in Arabic. This indirectly allowed Massignon to be closer to Arab Christians and Muslims alike.

As a Greek Catholic, he could be ordained as a priest although he was married (yet it was not for this reason that he had had himself transferred to Greek Catholicism). He was ordained by Bishop Kamel Medawar on 28 January 1950, with the permission of Patriarch Maximos IV, despite some opposition from the Holy See, which, however, finally accepted his priestly ordination. Being a priest meant for Massignon offering his life in substitution for others, especially for the Muslims.

=== Political commitment after World War II ===
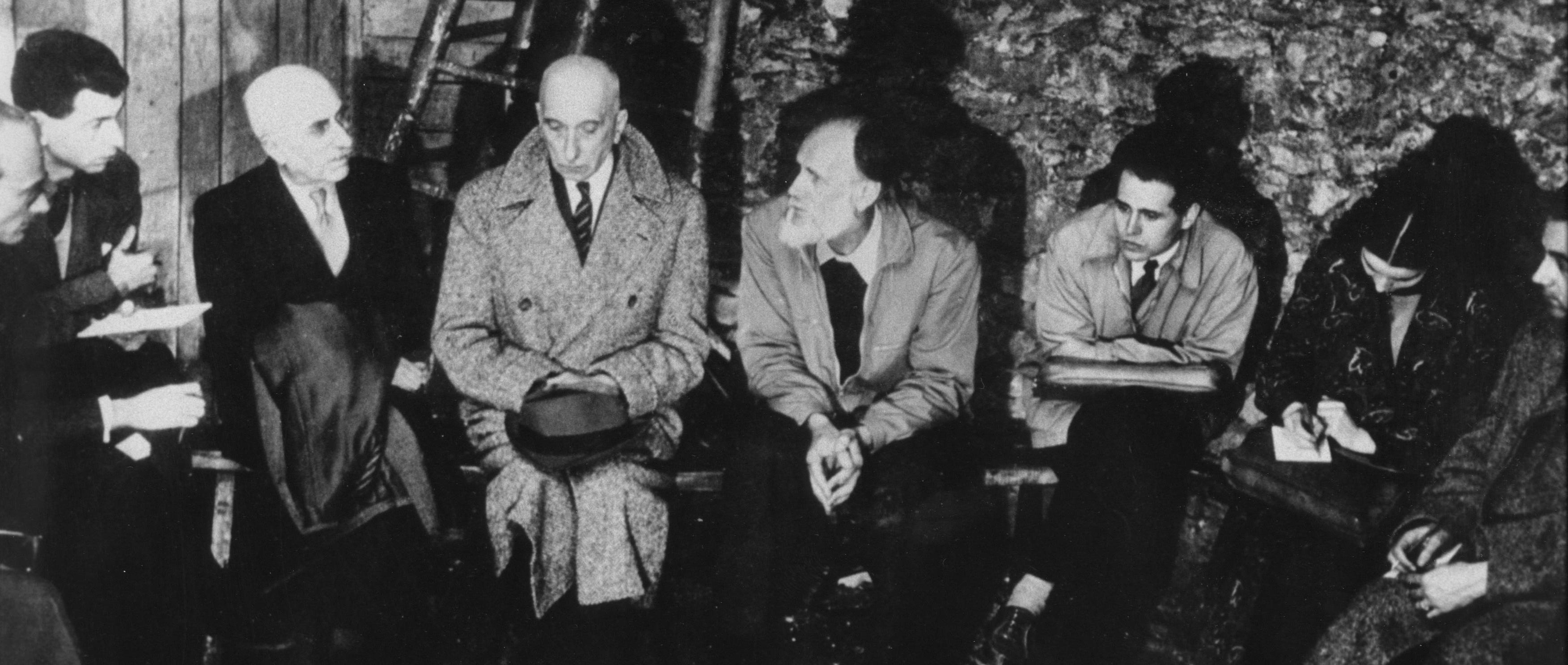
People fasting against torture during the Algeria War, Paris, 1957 (Lanza del Vasto, Louis Massignon, and others).

After World War II, while still remaining active as a scholar, his focus of attention shifted to political action to help Muslims and Arab Christians. In this he followed the model of Mahatma Gandhi, whose work he studied later in his life and considered a saint, and his principles of non-violent action (ahimsa and satyagraha). (He was also president of the Amis de Gandhi association.) He made it clear that he did not hope for success in all his areas of action, but that, first and foremost, he wanted to bear witness to Truth and Justice, just as Jesus Christ had done.

He committed himself to the following (in chronological order):

- For the Arabs living in Palestine who were displaced by the foundation of the state of Israel in 1948; he believed in peaceful coexistence of Jews, Muslims, and Christians in Palestine
- Against the French government's removal of the Sultan Sidi Muhammad of Morocco in 1953, promoted by two self-styled Muslim religious leaders, El Glaoui and El Kittani; he was supported in this by two committees, France-Islam and the newly founded France-Maghreb, the latter having among its members François Mitterrand, François Mauriac, André Julien
- For the amnesty of political prisoners in Madagascar, as president of the Comité pour l'amnistie aux condamnés politiques d'outre-mer. The committee finally reached this amnesty
- For a peaceful solution of the colonial tensions in Algeria which culminated in the Algerian War of Independence. As such, he set up during the war a Christian-Muslim pilgrimage to the chapel of the Seven Sleepers in Vieux-Marché due to the shared veneration of the saints by both religions.

Dialogue was very important for him; he also talked to the Iranian religious sociologist Ali Shariati who would later become extremely influential as a modernist Muslim thinker in Iran. Shariati had immense respect for Massignon and adored him as a teacher and a master in his book Kavir (book). In August 1957, Massignon participated in the International Meeting of the monastery of Toumliline, an inter-faith conference that focused that year on Education. At the end of the conference king Mohammed V invited the participants to his palace and awarded Massignon the Grand Cordon du Ouissam Alaoui, the equivalent of the French Legion of Honour for Morocco).

Massignon died on 31 October 1962, and was buried on 6 November in Pordic, Brittany. Louis Gardet, his friend and colleague, assisted in the posthumous edition of Louis Massignon's work La passion de Hussayn Ibn Mansûr an-Hallâj, published in 1975.

== Teaching ==
Among his students were many scholarly luminaries:

- Henry Corbin, whom he directed towards his major study of Suhrawardi (Shaykh Al-Ishraq)
- Eva de Vitray-Meyerovitch, convert to Islam and scholar of Jalâl ud Dîn Rûmî
- Abdel Rahman Badawi, the Egyptian scholar of Islamic philosophy
- Abd al-Halim Mahmud, Grand Shaykh of Al-Azhar University
- Vincent-Mansour Monteil
- George Makdisi
- Eliezer Paul Kraus, discovered Al-Farabi's commentaries The Philosophy of Plato and Aristotle, and the Commentary on Laws
- Ali Shariati, sociologist, philosopher and Iranian political activist
- Jean-Mohammed Abd-el-Jalil, convert from Islam and Franciscan friar, also a godson of Massignon

== Religious views ==
While firmly rooted in Catholic faith, Massignon was also inspired by Islamic theology, which made him a very independent thinker in religious matters, while he avoided any kind of heresy.

=== Religious beliefs ===
Massignon's faith can be characterized by the basic concepts of sacred hospitality (Arabic: diyafa), generosity (Arabic: karam, and mystical substitution (Arabic: badaliya).

==== Sacred hospitality ====
Sacred hospitality, a concept that was inspired by the Islamic commandment of hospitality, demands, in Massignon's eyes to accept anyone and even serve him without wanting to change him or wishing him to be different. It is also rooted in the life of Jesus Christ, "who asked for hospitality and died on a cross", thereby accepting even the violence of his executioners.

This concept also forms the basis for his strong belief in peaceful coexistence among different ethnicities, which made him speak out against the displacement of the Arabs from Palestine, as well as (at least initially) the decolonization of Algeria that implied the emigration of the French Algerians and Algerian Jews, the Pieds noirs, and the end of a multi-religious Algeria.

==== Substitution and intercession ====
The concept of mystical substitution was first suggested to Massignon by Huysmans' biography of Saint Lydwine of Schiedam, "whose life exemplified the writer's belief that one could atone for the sins of others by offering up one's suffering on their behalf." This is also, ultimately, a concept inspired by Jesus Christ, whose suffering on the Cross, according to Saint Paul, redeemed mankind from sin.

He also believed in the power of intercession—i.e., of praying for others—and had felt this power himself, especially during his conversion to Christianity.

Following this idea, Massignon wanted to dedicate his whole life as a substitute for the Muslims, not necessarily so that they would be converted (not putting up with their difference for religion would have been against his idea of sacred hospitality) but that God's will would be fulfilled through them. He also saw his becoming a priest later in life as a way of offering up his life for others.

=== View of Islam ===
In Massignon's view, Islam is a religion based on Muhammad's genuine inspiration, which made him see the oneness (tawhid) of God. This inspiration was completed by research in which Muhammad found the origins of the Arab people in the Biblical person of Ismael. He thus sees the revelation in Islam as a "mysterious answer of (divine) grace to Abraham's prayer for Ismael and the Arab race".

Massignon believes revelation to occur in three stages, the first being that of the patriarchs, to whom natural religion was revealed, second the revelation of the Law to Moses and third, Christ and his revelation of Divine Love. Islam is, in his eyes, a return to the natural religion of the patriarchs, "where God's essence cannot be known" and where man only has to accept what has been revealed to him about God's qualities and follow His laws, without seeking union with Him through these laws.

This model of different stages explains, according to Massignon, the differences in moral questions between Islam on the one hand and Judaism and Christianity on the other hand, such as Islam's permission of polygamy or its acceptance of war. It would therefore be absurd to criticize Muhammad for his polygamy, his warfare; there was just nothing bad about it for him. Furthermore, polygamy was well accepted and routinely practiced by Judaism before Islam, as per many wives of King David, King Solomon, and even Moses himself.

Massignon often talks of Islam as a naive and primitive religion but far from looking at Muslim faith with disdain, he sees in its existence of Islam a protest of those excluded by the Alliances of God with the Jews and Christian, and a criticism of the infidelity of the Elected, the Jews and Christians. Christians should therefore see themselves challenged by the presence of Islam to live a life of a simple sainthood, which is hard, yet not impossible, to attain from a Muslim background, and whose truth they can understand.

Given their common origin in Abraham, Christians should always approach Muslims as brothers in Abraham "united by the same spirit of faith and sacrifice", and offer up their lives for the salvation of the Muslims in mystical substitution, "giving to Jesus Christ, in the name of their brothers, the faith, adoration and love that an imperfect knowledge of the Gospel does not permit them to give". He thus wants to integrate them into salvation given by Christ without them having to become Christians themselves; an external conversion does not seem necessary to him, he rather envisages an "internal conversion" of Muslims within Islam.

He also sees some potential for further development of revelation within Islam: Islam saw it as its original mission, according to Massignon, to spread the message of the oneness of God even by means of violence so as to force all idol-worshippers to acknowledge it. Yet, there is also a tendency of Islam towards non-violence, to be recognized most clearly in the self-offering on Mount Arafat during the hajj, the pilgrimage to Mecca. Massignon believes that the self-offering of Muslim saints in substitution for their brothers can make Islam go ahead on the way of revelation. He even showed great admiration for some of Islam's saints, especially for al-Hallaj.

== Political views ==
Massignon's political action was guided by a belief in peaceful coexistence of different peoples and religions (which ultimately derived from his religious concept of sacred hospitality), and by the Gandhian principles of non-violent actions (satyagraha and ahimsa).

== Appraisal and criticism ==
=== Catholic view of Massignon ===
Although always remaining faithful to Catholicism and avoiding any suspicion of syncretism, Massignon's views were seen critically by many Catholics who considered him a syncretist, a "Catholic Muslim", although this was also used as a compliment by Pope Pius XI.

Massignon's appreciation of Islam was seminal for the change in Catholic view of Islam as it is reflected in the Vatican II declaration Nostra aetate, which shows a greater appreciation of Islam and next to the traditional missionary approach also talks of respectful dialogue with other religions. He died shortly after the opening of Vatican II, but his contacts with popes Pius XI, Pius XII, and John XXIII helped pave the way for this re-orientation.

=== Criticisms of Massignon's focus ===
Massignon was sometimes criticized by Muslims for giving too much importance to Muslim figures that are considered somewhat marginal by Islamic mainstream, such as al-Hallaj and for paying too much attention to Sufism, and too little to Islamic legalism.

Edward Said, a non-Muslim Arab-American scholar, wrote Massignon used Hallaj "to embody, to incarnate, values essentially outlawed by the mainstream doctrinal system of Islam, a system that Massignon himself described mainly in order to circumvent it with al-Hallaj".

=== Views of his students ===
In his thesis L'Islam dans le Miroir de l'Occident (1963), his Dutch student J. J. Waardenburg gave the following synthesis of Massignon's precepts: "1°- God is free to reveal Himself when and how He wants. 2°- The action of God is exercised in the world of grace that may also be outside Christianity; it can be found in Islam, in the mystical vocations. 3°- The religious discovery has an existential character, the religious object has a significance for the seeker. 4°- Religious science is a religious study in the proper sense of the word: it is a discovery of grace (i.e., the work of the Saint-Esprit, Rûh Allah, Holy Ghost)."

A "Catholic, scholar, Islamicist, and mystic" is how Seyyed Hossein Nasr describes him in his homage at the 1983 commemoration of the 100th birthday of Louis Massignon.

- Catholic: He played a key role in the acceptance by religious authority of the Rule for the Little Brothers of Jesus as dictated by Blessed Charles de Foucauld (1858–1916).
- Scholar: At the age of 29 (1912–1913) he delivered a series of 40 lectures in Arabic on the history of philosophy at the Egyptian University of Cairo; from 1922 till 1954 he was entitled the Chair of Muslim Sociology created in 1902 by Alfred Le Chatelier at the Collège de France with support of Algeria, Tunisia, and Morocco.
- Islamicist: He pioneered the studies of early Sufism in the west in two major contributions; 1°- Essai sur les origines du lexique technique de la mystique musulmane (Guenther ed., Paris 1922). 2°- La Passion d'al Hallâj (Guenther ed., Paris 1922.
- Mystic: He truly lived the deep spirituality of his faith in the inter-religious dialogue between Christianity and Islam; in a state described by Seyyed Hossein Nasr as manifesting "al-barakat al-isawiyyah".

== See also ==
- Our Lady of La Salette
- Lycée Louis-Massignon (disambiguation)

== Sources ==
- Borrmans, Maurice (1996). "Aspects Théologiques de la Pensée de Louis Massignon sur l'Islam". In Daniel Massignon (ed.). Louis Massignon et le dialogue des cultures (in French). Paris: Cerf. ISBN 9782204052702.
- Buck, Dorothy C. (1 June 2017). Louis Massignon: A Pioneer of Interfaith Dialogue. Blue Dome Press. p. Footnote 210. ISBN 978-1-68206-512-9.
- Gude, Mary Louise (1996). Louis Massignon – The Crucible of Compassion. Notre Dame IN: University of Notre Dame Press.
- Hourani, Albert (1991). Islam in European thought. Cambridge: Cambridge University Press. pp. 43–48. ISBN 978-0-521-39213-6.
- "Herbert Mason". Department of Religion, Boston University. Archived from the original on 7 May 2010.
- Krokus, Christian S. (2017). The Theology of Louis Massignon. CUA Press.
- O'Mahony, Anthony (18 November 2021). Bartholomew, Craig; Hughes, Fred (eds.). Explorations in a Christian Theology of Pilgrimage. Routledge. pp. 126–149. ISBN 978-1-351-93766-5.
- Laude, Patrick (2011). Louis Massignon: The Vow and the Oath. The Matheson Trust.
- Mason, Herbert (1988). Memoir of a friend, Louis Massignon. Notre Dame, Ind. : University of Notre Dame Press. ISBN 978-0-268-01365-3.
- Mémorial Louis Massignon, Sous la direction de Youakim Moubarac et des textes arabes de Ibrahim Madkour, Abd al-Rahman Badawi, Taha Hussein, etc., Dar el-Salam, Imprimerie de l'Institut Français d'Archéologie Orientale, Cairo, 1963. OCLC 20425710
- Morillon, Jean. Massignon. Classiques du XXième Siècle, Editions Universitaires, Paris, 1964.
- Moubarac, Youakim: Bibliographie de Louis Massignon. Réunie et classée par Y. Moubarac, Institut Français de Damas, Damascus, 1956. OCLC 61507397
- ––. Pentalogie Islamo-chrétienne, Volume 1: L'œuvre de Louis Massignon, Editions du Cénacle Libanais, Beirut, 1972. OCLC 1054570
- Nasr, Seyyed Hossein. In commemoration of Louis Massignon: Catholic, Scholar, Islamist and Mystic. University of Boston, November 18, 1983, in: Présence de Louis Massignon-Hommages et témoinages Maisonneuve et Larose ed. Paris 1987
- Louth, Andrew, ed. (17 February 2022). "Massignon, Louis". The Oxford Dictionary of the Christian Church. Oxford University Press. ISBN 978-0-19-263815-1.
- Waardenburg, Jacques (2005). "Louis Massignon (1883-1962) as a Student of Islam". Die Welt des Islams. 45 (3). Brill: 312–342. ISSN 0043-2539. JSTOR 20140697.
