= Behind the 1953 Coup in Iran =

2014 book by Ali Rahnema

Behind the 1953 Coup in Iran: Thugs, Turncoats, Soldiers, and Spooks
- First edition
- Author: Ali Rahnema
- Language: English
- Subject: 1953 Iranian coup d'état
- Publisher: Cambridge University Press
- Publication date: 2014
- Media type: Print
- Pages: 348 pp.
- ISBN: 9781139875974

Behind the 1953 Coup in Iran: Thugs, Turncoats, Soldiers, and Spooks is a 2014 book by Ali Rahnema in which the author examines the historical background of 1953 coup in Iran. It has been translated into French (as La chute de Mossadegh) and Persian.

== Content ==
Rahnema tries to provide a historical reconstruction of the 1953 coup d'état which overthrew Mohammed Mosaddeq's government. Mosaddeq's fall has been the subject of much research and debate due to the role of foreign governments, the sociopolitical impact on Iran, and the enduring influence the ousting had on Iran-US relations. Based on American, British and Iranian sources, the author closely examines the four-day period between the first unsuccessful coup and the second successful one, surveying in fine detail how the two coups were shaped by actors on both the Anglo-American and Iranian sides.

== Reception ==
The book has already received positive reviews by Ali Gheissari (University of San Diego), John Gurney (Wadham College) and Wm. Roger Louis.

Mark Gasiorowski describes this book as the "best account of how the coup occurred". Fariborz Mokhtari (University of Vermont) calles it "detailed and passionately written". Michael Axworthy appreciates the book but believes that Rahnema "overstates his argument".
