= Geneviève Massignon =

French historian and linguist

Geneviève Massignon (Paris, 27 April 1921 – 6 June 1966) was a French linguist, ethnologist, musicologist and historian who studied Acadian speech, as well as dialects and linguistic communities in Brittany, in the west of France and in Corsica. She published several important works based on this research.

== Biography ==
Massignon received her License-ès-lettres degree in 1941. In 1945 (after the Second World War), she took over from Jacques Pignon (who died prematurely) the task of preparing, for the CNRS, a linguistic atlas of the center-west of France, focussing on the departments of Vendée, Deux-Sèvres, Vienne, Charente and Charente-Maritime: the Poitevin-Saintongeais dialect area. At the time of her death, she had practically finished the surveys, which would be published by Brigitte Horiot under the title, Linguistic and Ethnographic Atlas: Poitou, Aunis, Saintonge, Angoumois. This atlas formed the basis of a dialectometric analysis of the dialect area performed by Liliane Jagueneau.

Her interest in researching the Acadian French community developed in response to the research of her older brother Yves Massignon, a human geographer who lived in Madawaska, Canada, where he studied the local French-Canadian community before his death at the age of 20. His research was published in a work entitled, In Canada, the Upper Valley of Saint-Jean (Madawaska) and the future of Franco-American. In 1946, Massignon obtained a scholarship from the French Ministry of Foreign Affairs' Cultural Relations department which enabled her to travel to the Canadian maritime provinces and to the Mississippi delta region to collect traditional Acadian folklore and stories and survey the local dialects. This investigation formed the basis for her PhD thesis, Les parlers français d'Acadie, which she defended in 1962.

In 1966, she was expected to attend the Franco-Acadian festivities at Belle-Île-en-Mer to commemorate the bicentennial of the Acadian settlements on the island. She died suddenly of a heart attack just before the event took place.

Besides her linguistic work, Massignon collected traditional stories and music from communities in Acadia, Brittany, Corsica and the west of France. A bibliography of her work has been published by the BNF.

Her father was the French Islamologist Louis Massignon. She had two brothers, Yves and Daniel Massignon.

== Geneviève Massignon Collection ==
Her papers were donated by the Geneviève Massignon family to the BNF in 1985.

== Honors ==
- Medal of the Academy of Letters of Quebec (1963); she is the first foreigner to receive the medal.

== Selected works ==
- Geneviève Massignon. Les parlers français d'Acadie : enquête linguistique / Paris : C. Klincksieck, [1962]. 2 v. (975 p.)
- Geneviève Massignon, Brigitte Horiot, Linguistic and Ethnographic Atlas of the West: Poitou, Aunis, Saintonge, Angoumois, 3 volumes, 1971–1983. [Edited by CNRS.]
- Geneviève Massignon. De bouche à oreilles - Le conte populaire français, Berger-Levrault, coll. Territories, 1983 (ISBN 2-7013-0520-9)
- Geneviève Massignon. Contes de l'Ouest, Brière, Vendée, Angoumois, éditions Érasme, Paris, 1954.
- Geneviève Massignon. Corsetes, Corsica Studies Center for the Faculty of Arts and Humanities of Aix-en-Provence. Ophrys Edition, Gap 1963.
- Geneviève Massignon. Traditional stories of the producers of linen from Trégor (Lower Brittany). A. and J. Picard and Cie, Paris 1965.
