= Ali Rahnema =

Iranian economist and historian

- Education: Université de Paris I, Tufts University
- Parent(s): Hamid Rahnema, Badruzzaman Zahir-Emami
- Scientific career
- Fields: Economics, History, Sociology
- Workplaces: American University of Paris
- Website: www.aup.edu/profile/arahnema

Ali Rahnema (Persian: علی رهنما; born 1952) is an Iranian economist and historian. He is a professor of economics at the American University of Paris. Rahnema is the son of former Iranian diplomat and politician Hamid Rahnema.

== Education ==
Rahnema has a BA from Lewis and Clark College, MA and MALD degrees from The Fletcher School of Law and Diplomacy of Tufts University, and a Doctorat de Troisième Cycle from the Université de Paris I - Sorbonne.

== Books ==
| Title | Publisher | Year | ISBN | |
|---|---|---|---|---|
| Call to Arms: Iran's Marxist Revolutionaries: Formation and Evolution of the Fada'is, 1964–1976 | Oneworld Publications | 2021 | 9781786079855 | |
| Shi'i Reformation in Iran: The Life and Theology of Shari'at Sangelaji | Routledge | 2015 | 9781472434166 | |
| Behind the 1953 Coup in Iran: Thugs, Turncoats, Soldiers, and Spooks | Cambridge University Press | 2014 | 9781139875974 | Persian and French translations |
| Superstition as Ideology in Iranian Politics: From Majlesi to Ahmadinejad | Cambridge University Press | 2011 | 978-1-139-49562-2 | Persian translation |
| An Islamic Utopian: A Political Biography of Ali Shariati | I.B.Tauris | 1998 | 978-1-86064-552-5 | Persian, Arabic, Turkish and Indonesian translations |
| The Pioneers of Islamic Revival | Zed Books | 1994 | 978-1-85649-254-6 | |
| The Pioneers of Islamic Revival | Zed Books | 2005 | 978-1842776155 | New Edition with Major New Introduction by the Editor, Malaysian Edition 2006. Indonesian translation |
| Islamic Economic Systems | Zed Books | 1994 | 978-1-85649-057-3 | Malaysian and Bosnian translations |
| The Secular Miracle: Religion, Politics, and Economic Policy in Iran | Zed Books | 1990 | 978-0-86232-938-9 | |

== See also ==
- Religious intellectualism in Iran
- Sources of sharia
- Movement of God-Worshipping Socialists
