= Kavir (book) =

Book by Ali Shariati

- Author: Ali Shariati
- Original title: کویر
- Language: Persian
- Publisher: unknown

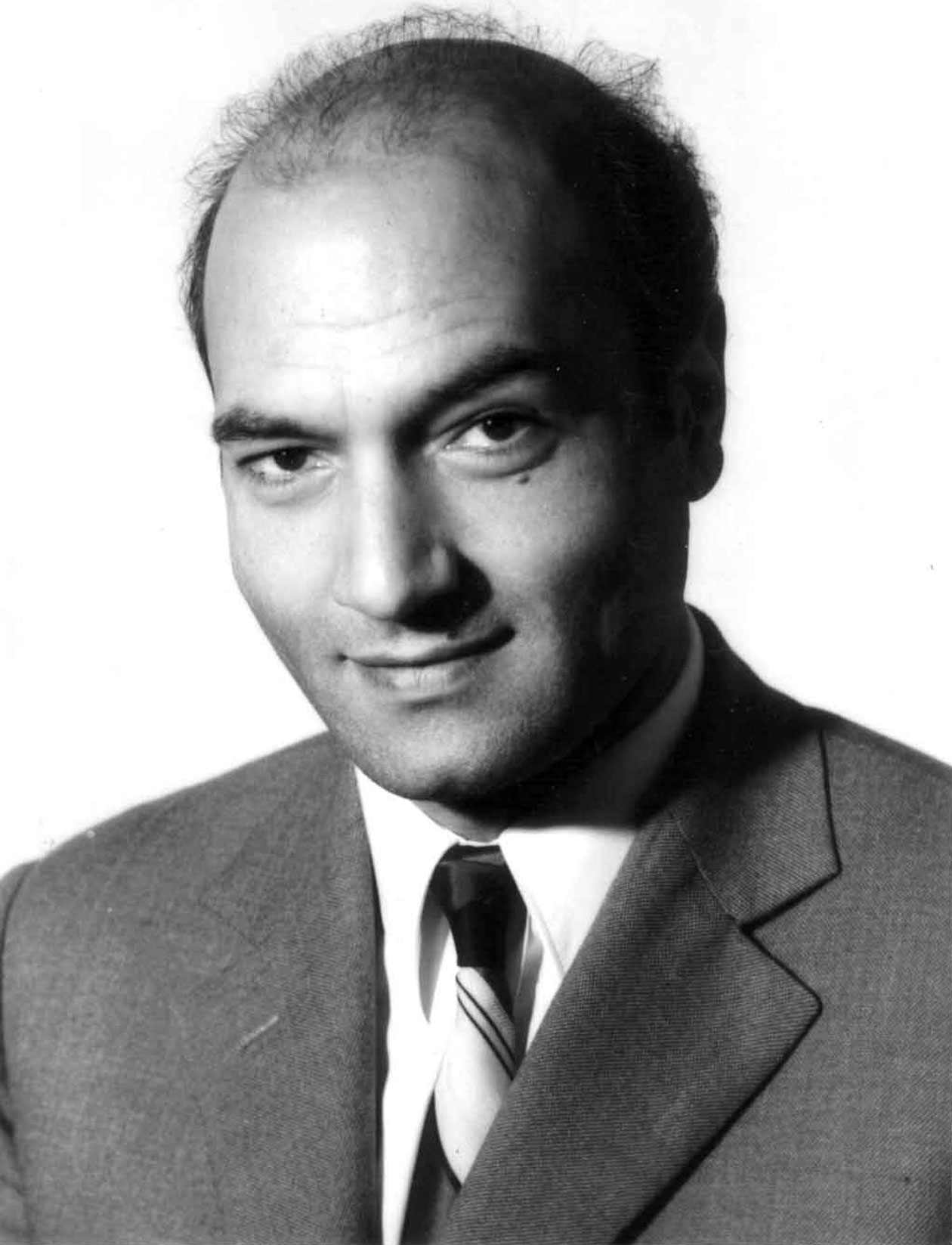
Dr. Ali Shariati

Kavir (Persian: کویر, lit. 'Desert') is one of the most important books of Iranian author Ali Shariati. The book could be considered among his personal writings.

== Description ==
The book is a collection of articles by Shariati. He called them Kavir, which literally means "desert". The book is of great importance in many ways. Kavir is also where Shariati was born and raised. In fact, Kavir is a metaphor for showing man's place on earth after falling. Kavir is also somewhere chosen by contemplatives to conduct a spiritually-oriented life. Kavir also refers to some memories of Shariati and to some of his ideas and insights explained in a poetical manner. Sometimes within the book, Shariati refers to quotations by other mystics and spiritualists in diverse religions. For example, he refers to Ayn Al Qozat Hamadani as brother and mentions a long passage of Hamadani instead of his own introduction. When Sharati read Hamadani's book, he was very affected by him.

Shariati preferred writing rather than lecturing and teaching. He also used the term Kaviriat that refers to the thing through which he lives. He expressed that almost every one of his publications could be considered as a piece of his being.

Also, the book is of stylistic dimensions such as paradigmatic axis and interaction one. He has used a historical approach in writing some words like Ghadimeh.
