= Referendums in Iran =

Five referendums in Iran were held since the first referendum was held in 1953 for dissolution or survival of 17th Iranian Majlis and the latest of those for revision of the Constitution of the Islamic Republic of Iran in 1989.

== Legal status ==
There is nothing in Persian Constitution of 1906 about the referendum but at the time enforcing this law (until 1978), two referendums were held (1953 and 1963). Third referendum (1979) was held when the Persian Constitution of 1906 had been fallen into desuetude with a victory of the revolution and as yet the new constitution had not been enacted for Iran. The fourth referendum (1979) was held for enactment the Constitution of the Islamic Republic of Iran and the fifth referendum (1989) was to review it. In Constitution of the Islamic Republic of Iran, referendum is part of popular sovereignty and was provided about it in Principles 1, 6, 59, 99, 110, 123, 132, 177 of the constitution. According to the referendum act of the Constitution of the Islamic Republic of Iran (1989), referendum will be held with the proposal of the president or 100 members of the Islamic Consultative Assembly and enactment of at least two-thirds of the total number of Members of them. The Ministry of Interior is responsible for holding referendum and Guardian Council for monitoring and confirmation it.

== Brief outline of referendums ==
Year	Proposed by	Held by	Issue	Yes votes (%)	Result	Ref
1953	Mohammad Mossadegh	2nd Cabinet of Mosaddegh	Dissolution of parliament		17th Iranian Majlis dissolved	
1963	Mohammad Reza Pahlavi	1st Cabinet of Alam	Land reform and Electoral reform		White Revolution declared	
1979	Ruhollah Khomeini	Cabinet of Bazargan	Regime change		Government of the Islamic Republic of Iran declared	
1979	Ruhollah Khomeini	Council of the Islamic Revolution	Constitution adoption		Constitution drafted by the Assembly of Experts was adopted	
1989	Ruhollah Khomeini	2nd Cabinet of Mousavi	Constitutional amendment		Constitution of the Islamic Republic of Iran amended	
