= 2,500-year celebration of the Persian Empire =

1971 national event in Iran

Celebration of the 2,500th Anniversary of the Founding of the Persian Empire
- The Cyrus Cylinder, which was framed by the Iranian King Mohammad Reza Pahlavi as the event's official logo, owing to his claim that it was the "first charter of human rights" in history.

- Persepolis (Iran) Location of Persepolis, which was the ceremonial capital city of the Achaemenid Empire, and which therefore served as the event's primary venue.
- Native name: جشن‌های ۲۵۰۰ ساله شاهنشاهی ایران
- Date: 12–16 October 1971
- Location: Imperial State of Iran; 29°56′04″N 52°53′29″E
- Also known as: 2,500-year celebration of the Persian Empire
- Motive: Honouring the legacy of ancient Iran under the Achaemenid dynasty and showcasing the progress of modern Iran under the Pahlavi dynasty

The 2,500-year celebration of the Persian Empire, officially known as the 2,500-year celebration of the Empire of Iran (Persian: جشن‌های ۲۵۰۰ ساله شاهنشاهی ایران, romanized: Jašn-hây-e 2500 sale' šâhanšâhi Irân), was hosted by the Pahlavi dynasty in the Imperial State of Iran in October 1971. Concentrated at Persepolis, it consisted of an elaborate set of grand festivities that sought to honour the legacy of the Achaemenid Empire, which was founded by Cyrus the Great in 550 BC. The event was aimed at highlighting ancient Iranian history and also showcasing the country's contemporary advances under Mohammad Reza Pahlavi, who had been reigning as the Shah of Iran since 1941. The site brought sixty members of royalty and heads of state from abroad.

Some historians take the view that its role in the massive display of seemingly unlimited royal wealth contributed to the Iranian populace's growing frustration with the Pahlavi dynasty, while others argue that the extravagance of the proceedings was exaggerated during the Islamic Revolution to discredit the Shah's regime. As a result, some accounts have overstated the event's costs and luxuries.

== Planning ==
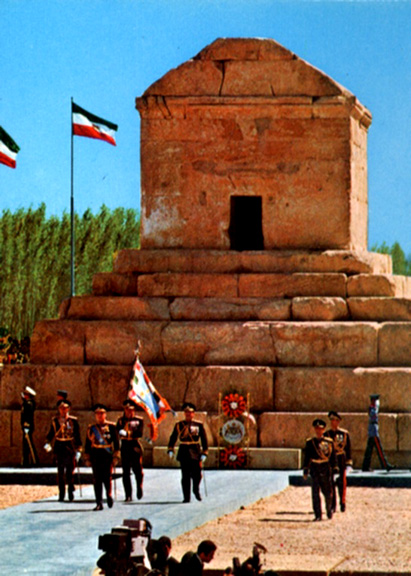
The Tomb of Cyrus the Great, located at Pasargadae, where the festivities began on 12 October 1971.

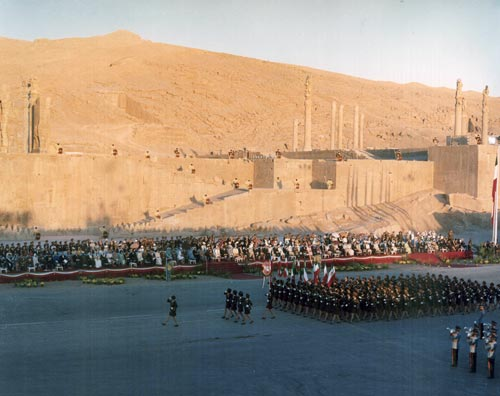
The military parade in Persepolis during the celebrations.

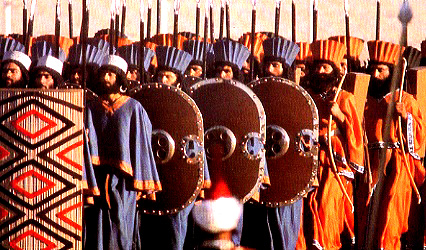
Persian Immortals, as portrayed during the parade.

The planning for the party took a year, according to the 2016 BBC Storyville documentary Decadence and Downfall: The Shah of Iran's Ultimate Party. The filmmakers interviewed people tasked by the Shah to organize the party. Asadollah Alam, minister of the Royal Court, was named to head the organizing committee. The Cyrus Cylinder appeared in the official logo as the symbol for the event. With the decision to hold the main event at the ancient city of Persepolis, near Shiraz, the local infrastructure had to be improved, including the Shiraz International Airport and a highway to Persepolis. While the press and supporting staff would be housed in Shiraz, the main festivities were planned for Persepolis. An elaborate tent city was planned to house attendees. The area around Persepolis was cleared of snakes and other vermin. Trees and flowers were planted, and 50,000 song birds were imported from Europe. Other events were scheduled for Pasargadae, the site of the Tomb of Cyrus, as well as Tehran.

== Tent City of Persepolis ==
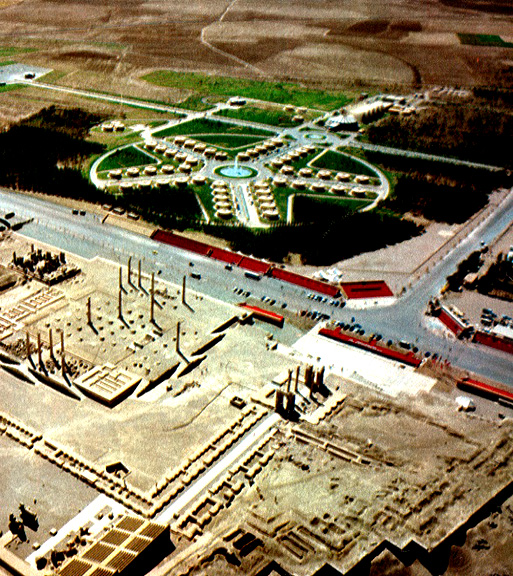
Tent City of Persepolis.

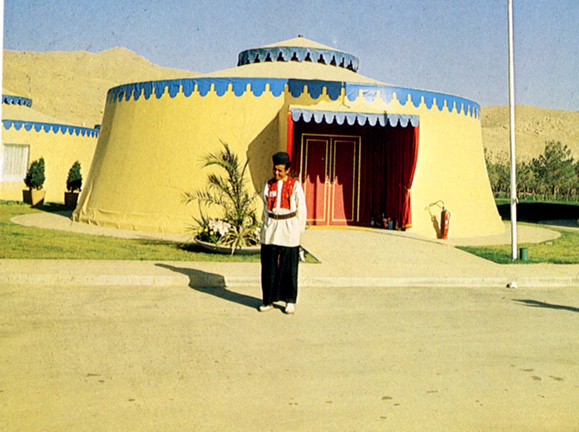
Tent in Persepolis.

The Tent City (also called Golden City) was planned by the Parisian interior-design firm of Maison Jansen on 160 acres (0.65 km^{2}). They referred to the meeting between Francis I of France and Henry VIII of England at the Field of the Cloth of Gold in 1520. Fifty 'tents' (prefabricated luxury apartments with traditional Persian tent-cloth surrounds) were arranged in a star pattern around a central fountain. Numerous trees were planted around them in the desert, to recreate how ancient Persepolis would have looked. Each tent was provided with direct telephone and telex connections for attendees to their respective countries. The entire celebration was televised to the world by way of a satellite connection from the site.

The large 'Tent of Honor' was designed for the reception of the dignitaries. The 'Banqueting Hall' was the largest structure, and measured 68 by 24 metres (223 ft × 79 ft). The tent site was surrounded by gardens of trees and other plants flown in from France and adjacent to the ruins of Persepolis. Catering services were provided by Maxim's de Paris, which closed its restaurant in Paris for almost two weeks to provide for the glittering celebrations. Legendary hotelier Max Blouet came out of retirement to supervise the banquet. Lanvin designed the uniforms of the Imperial Household. 250 red Mercedes-Benz 600 limousines were used to chauffeur guests from the airport and back. The dinnerware was created using Limoges porcelain and linen by D. Porthault.

== Festivities ==
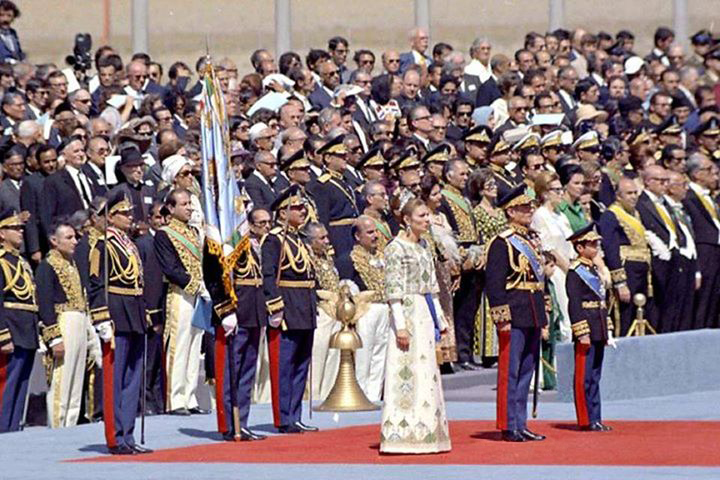
2,500-year celebration of the Persian Empire in the tomb of Cyrus the Great

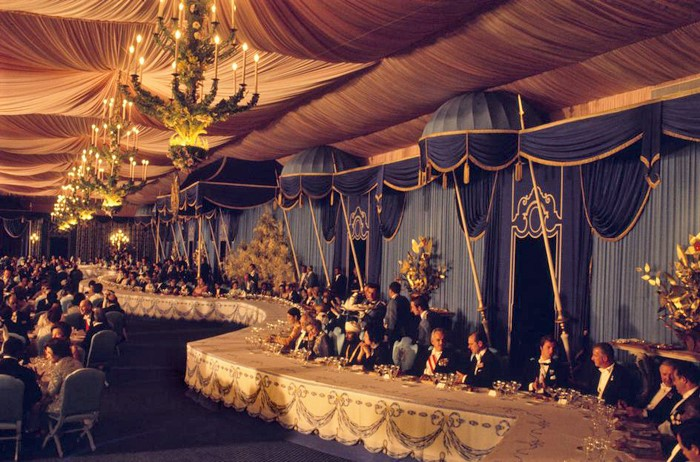
Dinner ceremony during the 2,500-year celebration of the Persian Empire

The festivities were opened on 12 October 1971, when the Shah and the Shahbanu paid homage to Cyrus the Great at his mausoleum at Pasargadae. For the next two days, the Shah and his wife greeted arriving guests, often directly at Shiraz's airport. On 14 October, a grand gala dinner took place in the Banqueting Hall in celebration of the birthday of the Shahbanu. Sixty members of royal families and heads of state were assembled at the single large serpentine table in the Banqueting Hall. They dined off a special dinner service of 10,000 plates commissioned from the English china manufacturer Spode, each plate decorated in turquoise and gold, with the Shah's coat of arms. The official toast was raised with a Dom Perignon Rosé 1959.

Six hundred guests dined over five and a half hours, thus making for the longest and most lavish official banquet in modern history as recorded in successive editions of the Guinness Book of World Records. A son et lumière show, the Polytope of Persepolis designed by Iannis Xenakis and accompanied by the specially-commissioned electronic music piece Persepolis, concluded the evening. The next day saw a huge military parade of armies of different Iranian empires covering two and half millennia by 1,724 soldiers of the Iranian armed forces, all in period costume, followed by representatives of the Imperial Armed Forces, with a large military band, composed of military musicians and providing the music for the parade, split into two—the modern band playing in Western instruments and a traditional band wearing uniforms from different eras of Iranian history. In the evening, a less formal "traditional Persian party" was held in the Banqueting Hall as the concluding event at Persepolis.

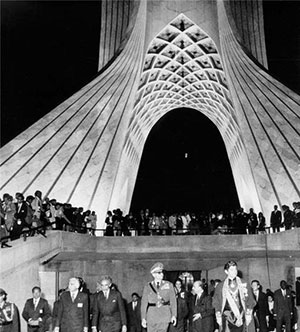
The inauguration of the Shahyad Tower

On the final day, the Shah inaugurated the Shahyad Tower (later renamed the Azadi Tower after the Iranian Revolution) in Tehran to commemorate the event. The tower was also home to the Museum of Persian History. In it was displayed the Cyrus Cylinder, which the Shah promoted as "the first human rights charter in history". The cylinder was also the official symbol of the celebrations, and the Shah's first speech at Cyrus' tomb praised the freedom that it had proclaimed, two and a half millennia previously. The festivities were concluded with the Shah paying homage to his father, Reza Shah Pahlavi, at his mausoleum.

The event brought together the rulers of two of the three oldest extant monarchies, the Shah and Emperor Haile Selassie I of Ethiopia. Emperor Hirohito of Japan was represented by his youngest brother, Prince Mikasa. By the end of the decade, both the Ethiopian and Iranian monarchies had been abolished.

== Security ==
Security was a major concern. Persepolis was a favoured site for the festivities as it was isolated and thus could be tightly guarded, a very important consideration when many of the world's leaders were gathered there. Iran's security services, SAVAK, captured and took into "preventive custody" anyone that they suspected of being a potential threat.

== Criticism ==
The Ministry of the Court placed the cost at US$17 million (at that time); Ansari, one of the organizers, puts it at US$22 million (at that time). The actual figure is difficult to calculate exactly and is a partisan issue. The New York Times reported several months before the event, "The enormous expense of the celebration is hardly likely to strain the treasury, which is enriched by oil and many other resources. But there is muted criticism here of such conspicuous expenditure in the face of widespread poverty and back wardness [sic] in this largely rural country of almost 30 million people."

According to the BBC documentary Decadence and Downfall, the celebrations cost about 120 million United States dollars. However, this claim has been described as having no real basis. In addition, the documentary claims the approximately 50,000 birds the Shah imported died within a few days due to the desert climate. Historian Robert Steele has described this claim as infeasible, arguing that the October climate in Persepolis is more mild than reported and so the birds would have been accustomed to the local weather. Many accounts from journalists and historians exaggerate cost estimates and claim the regime wanted to spend whatever was necessary. However, the Shah only approved the celebration plans after the scope was reduced to one-quarter of the original plan in order to reduce costs.

== List of guests ==
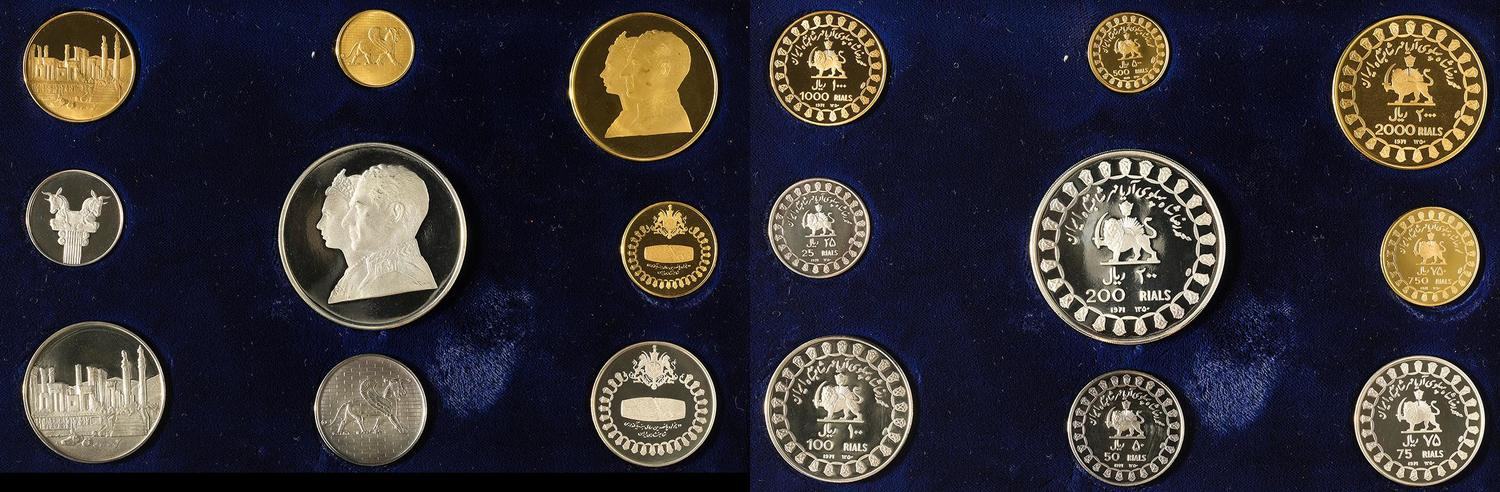
Commemorative set of 9 gold and silver coins, minted in Iran

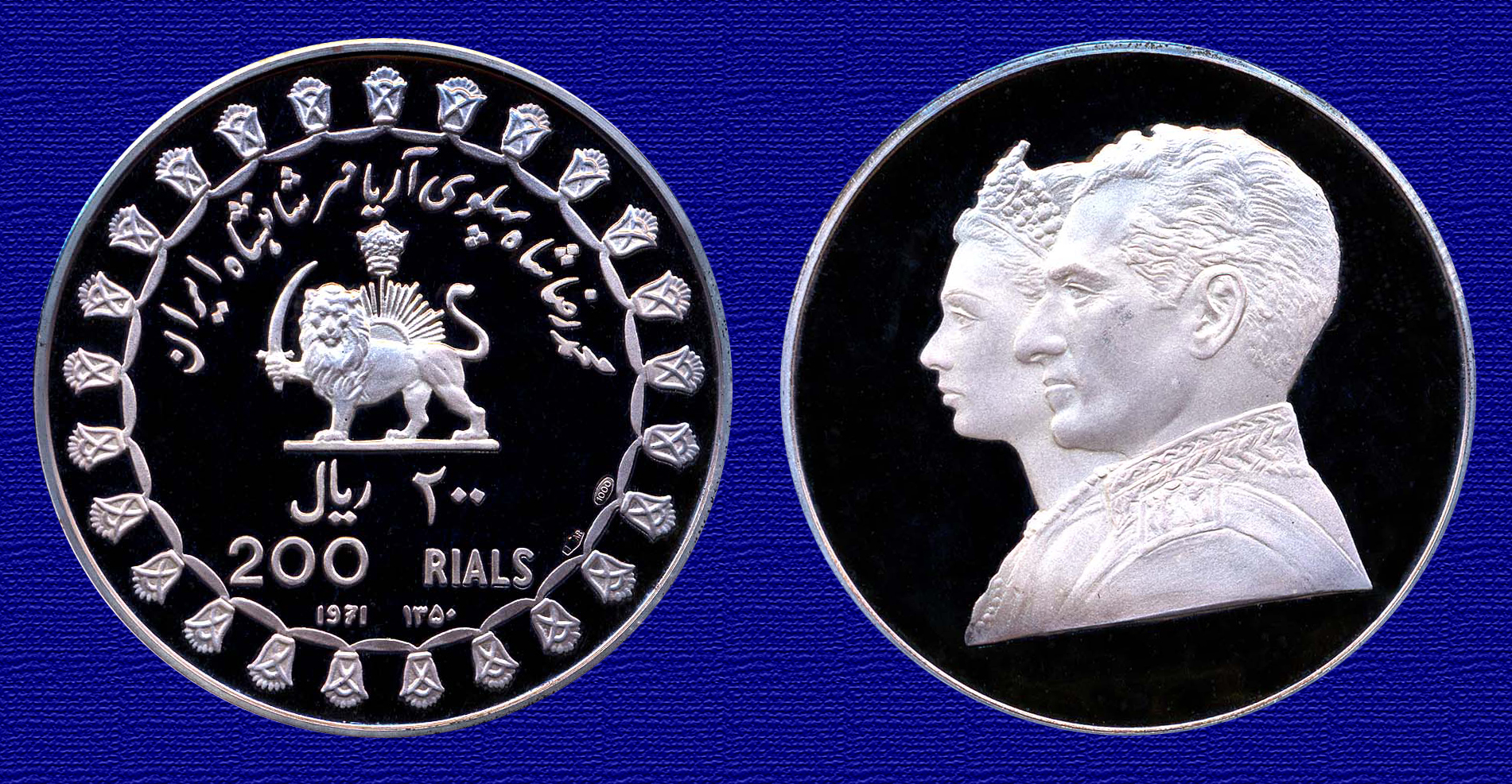
Commemorative silver coins from a set minted on the occasion of the celebrations

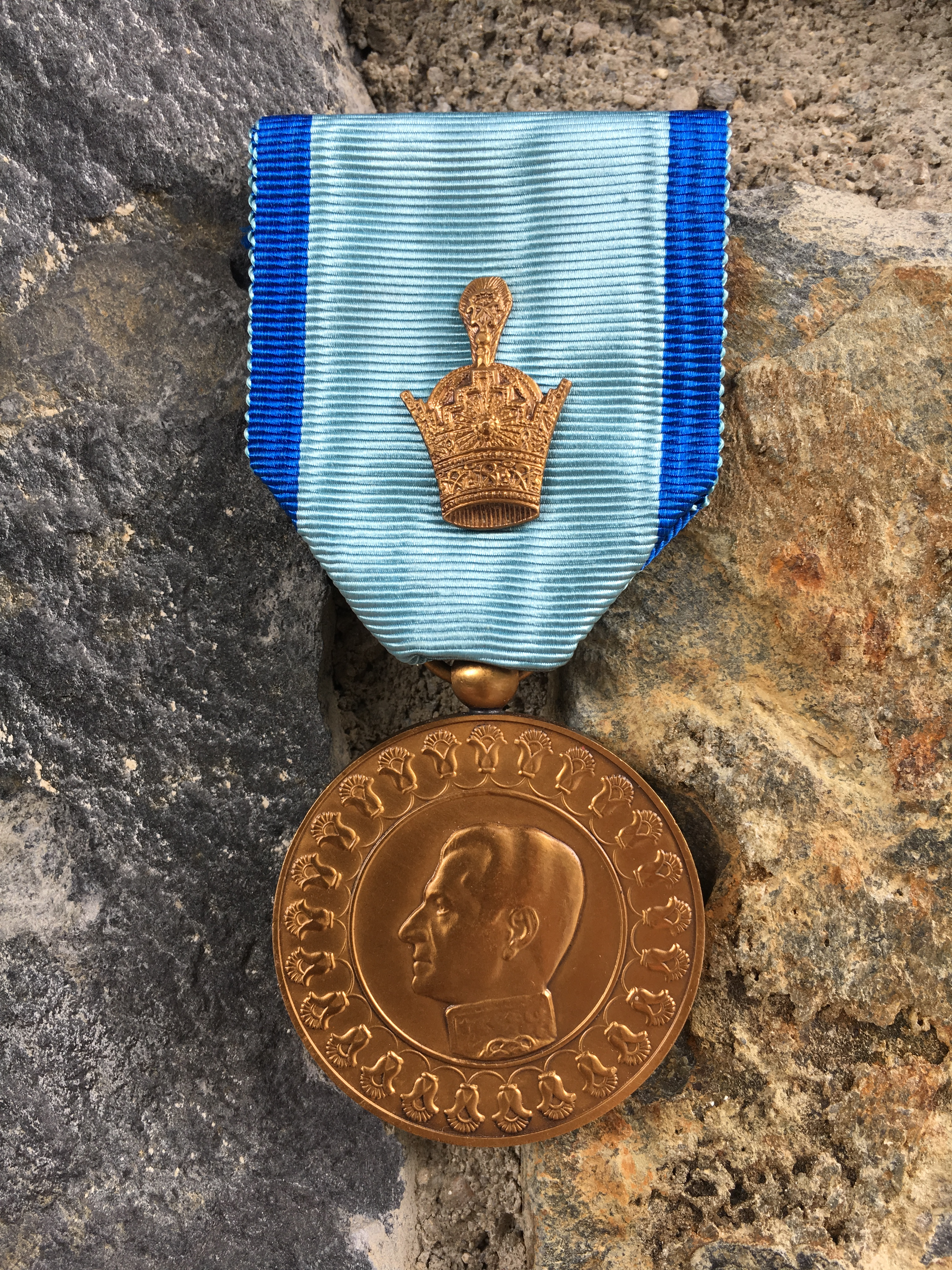
Obverse of the medal for the 2,500th anniversary of the Persian Empire.

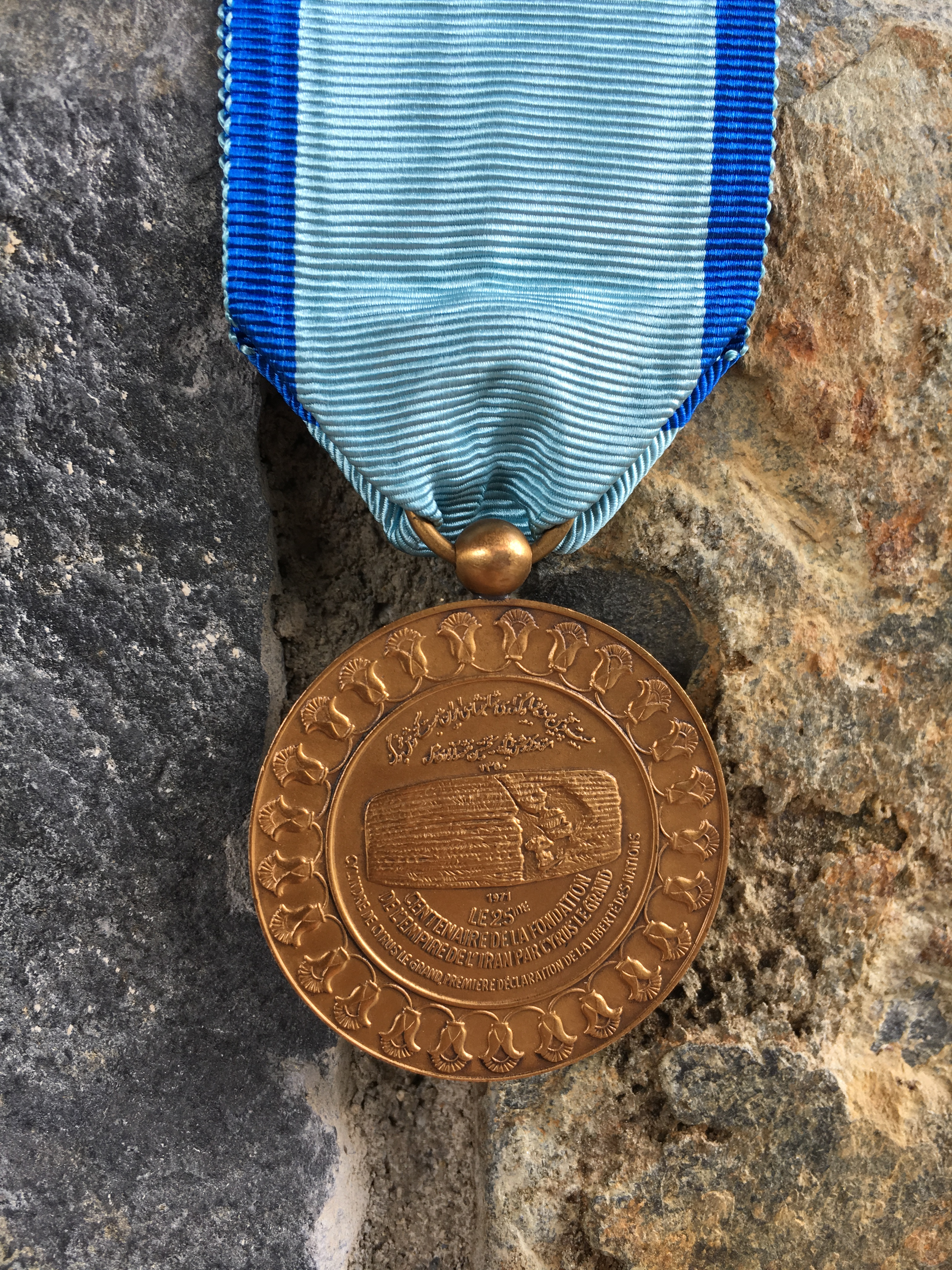
Reverse of the medal for the 2,500th anniversary of the Persian Empire

Queen Elizabeth II had been advised not to attend, with security being an issue. The Duke of Edinburgh and Princess Anne represented her instead. Other major leaders who did not attend were Richard Nixon and Georges Pompidou. Nixon had initially planned to attend but later changed his mind and sent Spiro Agnew instead.

Some materials say that the attendee on China’s behalf was Guo Moruo. According to his daughter, Guo was originally planned to attend, but he fell ill in transit and then-Chinese Ambassador to Pakistan Zhang Tong attended instead.

Some of the guests who were invited include:

=== Royalty and viceroys ===
Title	Guest	Country
Emperor	Haile Selassie	Ethiopia
Princess	Sara Gizaw	Ethiopia
King	Frederik IX	Denmark
Queen	Ingrid	Denmark
King	Baudouin	Belgium
Queen	Fabiola	Belgium
King	Hussein	Jordan
Princess	Muna	Jordan
Princess	Basma	Jordan
King	Mahendra	Nepal
Queen	Ratna	Nepal
King	Olav V	Norway
Emir	Sheikh Isa bin Salman Al Khalifa	Bahrain
Emir	Sheikh Ahmad bin Ali Al Thani	Qatar
Emir	Sheikh Sabah III Al-Salim Al-Sabah	Kuwait
King	Constantine II	Greece (Note: The Greek royal family was in exile at the time, despite being formally on the throne; at home, royal authority was exercised by a regent appointed by the Greek junta)
Queen	Anne-Marie	Greece
Prince	Michael	Greece
Princess	Marina	Greece
Sultan	Qaboos bin Said	Oman
Princess	Bilqis Begum	Afghanistan
Sardar	Abdul Wali Khan	Afghanistan
King	Moshoeshoe II	Lesotho
Yang di-Pertuan Agong	Tunku Abdul Halim	Malaysia
Raja Permaisuri Agong	Bahiyah	Malaysia
Sheikh	Zayed bin Sultan Al Nahyan	Abu Dhabi
Prince	Franz Josef II	Liechtenstein
Princess	Gina	Liechtenstein
Prince	Rainier III	Monaco
Princess	Grace	Monaco
Grand Duke	Jean	Luxembourg
Grand Duchess	Joséphine-Charlotte	Luxembourg
Princess	Marie Astrid	Luxembourg
Prince	Bernhard	Netherlands
Prince Consort	Philip	United Kingdom and Commonwealth realms
Princess	Anne	United Kingdom and Commonwealth realms
Prince	Aga Khan IV	Nizari Imamate
Princess	Begum Om Habibeh Aga Khan	Nizari Imamate
Crown Prince	Carl Gustaf	Sweden
Prince	Juan Carlos	Spain
Princess	Sofia	Spain
Prince	Victor Emmanuel	Italy
Princess	Marina	Italy
Prince	Takahito	Japan
Princess	Yuriko	Japan
Prince	Bhanubandhu Yugala	Thailand
Prince	Moulay Abdallah	Morocco
Princess	Lalla Lamia	Morocco
Prince	Makhosini Dlamini	Swaziland
Governor General	Roland Michener	Canada
Governor-General	Sir Paul Hasluck	Australia

=== Presidents, Vice Presidents, Prime Ministers and others ===
Title	Guest	Country
President	Franz Jonas	Austria
First Lady	Jovanka Broz	Yugoslavia
President	Josip Broz Tito	Yugoslavia
Chairman of the Presidium	Nikolai Podgorny	Soviet Union
Chairman of the State Council	Todor Zhivkov	Bulgaria
President	Urho Kekkonen	Finland
President	V. V. Giri	India
Vice President	Gopal Swarup Pathak	India
President of the Presidential Council	Pál Losonczi	Hungary
President	Cevdet Sunay	Turkey
President	Suharto	Indonesia
President	Ludvík Svoboda	Czechoslovakia
President	Suleiman Frangieh	Lebanon
President	Yahya Khan	Pakistan
State President	Jacobus Johannes Fouché	South Africa
President	Léopold Sédar Senghor	Senegal
President	Moktar Ould Daddah	Mauritania
President	Hubert Maga	Dahomey
President	Nicolae Ceaușescu	Romania
First Lady	Elena Ceaușescu	Romania
President	Mobutu Sese Seko	Zaire
Prime Minister	Jacques Chaban-Delmas	France
Prime Minister	Kim Jong-pil	South Korea
Prime Minister	Emilio Colombo	Italy
Deputy Chairman of the Council of State	Mieczysław Klimaszewski	Poland
Vice President	Spiro Agnew	United States
Second Lady	Judy Agnew	United States
Vice President	Hussein el-Shafei	Egypt
Chief	Earl Old Person	Blackfeet Nation
President of the Federal Senate	Petrônio Portella	Brazil
President of the Bundestag	Kai-Uwe von Hassel	West Germany
Foreign Minister	Rui Patrício	Portugal
First Lady	Imelda Marcos	Philippines
Former President	Friedrich Wahlen	Switzerland
Cardinal	Maximilian von Fürstenberg	Holy See
Minister of Foreign Affairs	Arístides Calvani	Venezuela
Ambassador to Pakistan	Zhang Tong	China

== Film ==
Flames of Persia (1:00:01)

Iran's National Film Board produced a documentary of the celebrations, titled Forugh-e Javidan (فروغ جاویدان, lit. 'Eternal Light') in Persian and Flames of Persia in English. Farrokh Golestan directed, and Orson Welles, who had said of the event "This was no party of the year, it was the celebration of 25 centuries!", agreed to narrate the English text, written by Macdonald Hastings, in return for the Shah's brother-in-law funding Welles's own film, The Other Side of the Wind (which eventually went into development hell but was eventually posthumously released by Netflix in 2018). The film was aimed at a Western audience. Despite a requirement to show the film in 60 cinemas in Tehran, its "overheated rhetoric" and popular resentment at the extravagance of the event meant it did poorly at the domestic box office.

In the Review of Middle East Studies in 1980, Ellen-Fairbanks Bodman referred to "a Cecil B. DeMille-type parade – a sequence of Iranian dynasties and peoples in orderly array: no conquests, no struggles, no internal conflicts, no Arabs, no Mongols." She also notes only a single reference to Islam and that "the Shah waves to happy peasantry and smiles at the idyllic bucolic revelries of his admiring people. Only two chadors are in fleeting evidence among the crowds, and the camera prefers girls dancing in tight corduroy pants. Attention is paid to modern housing developments and technology, none to land reform or agriculture."

== Legacy ==
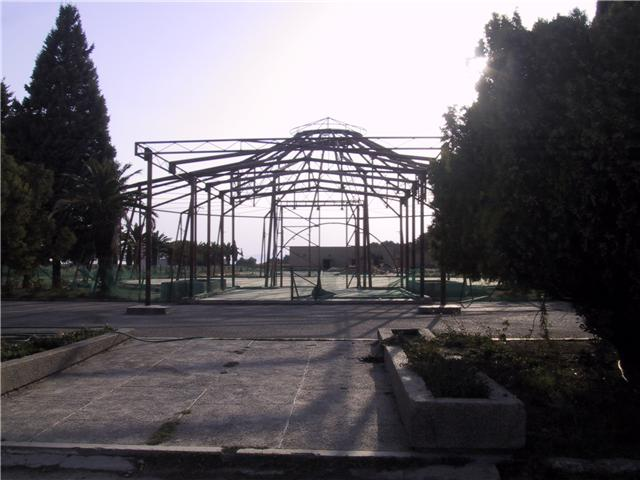
Persepolis tent city ruins in 2007

Persepolis remains a major tourist attraction in Iran. In 2005, reports suggested that the Islamic Republic of Iran intended to reconstruct the tent city created for the 1971 celebration. In 2005, it was visited by nearly 35,000 people during the Nowruz holiday.

The tent city continued operating for private and government rent until 1979, when it was looted in the aftermath of the Iranian Revolution and the departure of the Shah. The iron rods for the tents and roads built for the festival area still remain and are open to the public, but there are no markers indicating what they were originally for. The dedicated Shahyad Tower remains as a major landmark in Tehran, although it was renamed Azadi Tower in 1979.

== See also ==
- Iranian Art Museum Garden
- Monarchism in Iran
- Coronation of Mohammad Reza Pahlavi
- List of monarchs of Persia
