= Education Corps =

Education Corps may refer to:

- Education Corps (Iran), 1972 winner of the UNESCO Nadezhda K. Krupskaya literacy prize
- Education and Youth Corps, Israel Defense Forces corps responsible for the education of soldiers
- Pakistan Army Education Corps, a corps within the Pakistan Army
- Royal Army Educational Corps, former corps of the British Army tasked with educating and instructing personnel
- Royal Australian Army Educational Corps, a specialist corps within the Australian Army
- Army Education Corps (India), an Indian Army Corps
