= Hossein Navab =

Iranian politician and diplomat (1897–1972)

- حسین نواب

Minister of Foreign Affairs of Iran
- In office 26 July 1952 – October 1952
- Monarch: Mohammad Reza Pahlavi
- Prime Minister: Mohammad Mosaddegh
- Preceded by: Bagher Kazemi
- Succeeded by: Hossein Fatemi

Personal details
- Born: Mirza Hossein Khan Navab; 1897
- Died: 1972 (aged 74–75)

Hossein Navab or Hossein Navvab (Persian: حسین نواب; 1897–1972) was an Iranian diplomat, who served as foreign minister briefly in 1952.

== Career ==
Navab was a career diplomat. In the 1930s he was second secretary at the Iranian Embassy in London. He served as the consul general of Iran in New York in the 1940s. He was also the ambassador of Iran to the Netherlands. He served as the minister of foreign affairs in the second cabinet of Prime Minister Mohammad Mosaddegh which was announced on 26 July 1952. Navab resigned from office without citing any reason on 9 October 1952, and Hossein Fatemi succeeded him in the post.
