= Peykar =

Peykar may refer to:

- Peykar or the Organization of Struggle for the Emancipation of the Working Class, a splinter group from the People's Mujahedin of Iran
- Peykar (1979 newspaper), an Iranian newspaper associated with the above group
- Peykar (1931 newspaper), a journal of the Communist Party of Persia
- Hizb-i Paykār, a 1940s Iranian nationalist organization
