= Bakhtar-e Emruz =

Iranian daily newspaper (1949–1953)

- Founder: Hossein Fatemi
- Editor: Nasrallah Sifta; Hossein Fatemi
- Founded: 9 August 1949
- Ceased publication: 19 August 1953
- Political alignment: Nationalist
- Language: Persian
- Headquarters: Tehran
- Country: Iran

Bakhtar-e Emruz (Persian: باختر امروز, lit. 'Today's West') was a Persian-language daily newspaper published in the period 1949–1953. The paper is known for its founder and editor Hossein Fatemi, an executed journalist and minister of foreign affairs, and for its affiliation with the National Front. The title of the paper was a reference to two former newspapers which had been published and contributed by Fatemi, namely Bakhtar and Mard-i Imruz.

== History and profile ==
Bakhtar-e Emruz was founded by Hossein Fatemi in 1949. The first issue of the paper appeared on 9 August 1949. Fatemi and Nasrallah Sifta were the co-editors. The paper was close to the National Front and Mohammad Mosaddegh. In fact, the paper became the official organ of the National Front from October 1949. It was among the national publications which were critical of the Pahlavi rule, the Tudeh party and the Fascist groups.

Fatemi's editorship continued until February 1952 when he survived, but was seriously injured in an assassination attempt. The editorial board of the paper included Mohit Tabatabai, Jalali Naini, Rahmat Mostafawi, Sepehr Zabih, Nasser Amini, and Esmail Purvali. Bakhtar-e Emruz had a format slightly longer than tabloid and covered national and international news. It was banned by the Iranian authorities several times, and its editor, Fatemi, was jailed. The paper was permanently shut down following the coup d'état which overthrown the government of Mohammad Mosaddegh. In addition, the headquarters of the paper was attacked and burned by the supporters of Shah Mohammad Reza Pahlavi. The last issue of Bakhtar-e Emruz was published on 19 August 1953.

=== Spin off ===
Bakhtar-e Emrooz was revived by the National Front members in Europe in 1959. The paper was also published in New York City between 1961 and 1966. In the 1970s the exiled members of the National Front published a paper with the same title, Bakhtar-e Emruz, in Beirut. The paper targeted Iranian students.
