= Hizb-i Paykār =

Peykar Party
- Founder: Khosrow Eghbal
- Merged into: Motherland Party
- Newspaper: Iran-e Ma; Nabard; Mard-i Imruz
- Ideology: Iranian nationalism
- Political position: Centrism

Hizb-i Paykār (Persian: حزب پیکار, lit. 'Battle Party') was a small nationalist organization in Iran during 1940s. The party denounced the reign of Reza Shah and it condemned the presence of the Allies on Iranian soil.

According to L. P. Elwell-Sutton, the party was composed of intellectuals, and at some time was sympathized by figures such as Hossein Ala and Isa Sedigh.

One of its organs "showed inclinations in favor of Nazi Germany", while the party "tended towards France, and against the soviet Union". In 1943 a weekly newspaper entitled Mard-i Imruz which had been launched by Mohammad Masud in 1942 became the official media outlet of the party.
