= Governments of Mohammad Mosaddegh =

Iranian governments (1951–1953)

First Cabinet of Mohammad Mosaddegh
- Cabinet of Iran

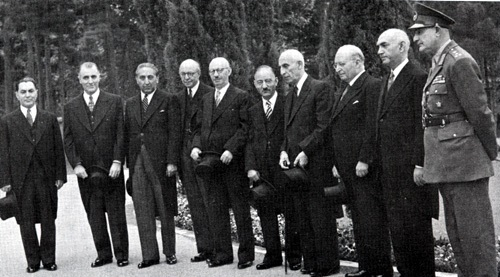
- Mosaddegh and his first cabinet members
- Date formed: 28 April 1951
- Date dissolved: 16 July 1952

People and organisations
- Head of state: Mohammad Reza Pahlavi
- Head of government: Mohammad Mosaddegh
- Deputy head of government: Bagher Kazemi
- No. of ministers: 12
- Ministers removed: 10
- Total no. of members: 22
- Status in legislature: 16th term: 8-seats minority influence 8 / 136 (6%)

History
- Election: 1950 legislative election
- Legislature terms: 16th (1950–52); 17th (1952)
- Predecessor: Government of Hossein Ala'
- Successor: Qavam (V)

Second Cabinet of Mohammad Mosaddegh
- Cabinet of Iran

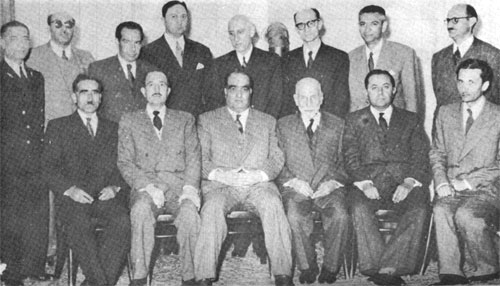
- Mosaddegh and his second cabinet members
- Date formed: 21 July 1952
- Date dissolved: 19 August 1953

People and organisations
- Head of state: Mohammad Reza Pahlavi
- Head of government: Mohammad Mosaddegh
- Deputy head of government: Gholam Hossein Sadighi
- No. of ministers: 12
- Ministers removed: 2
- Total no. of members: 14
- Member parties: National Front
- Status in legislature: 30-seats minority resorted to rule by decree 30 / 136 (22%)
- Opposition party: Monarchists

History
- Elections: 1952 legislative election 1953 referendum
- Legislature term: 17th
- Outgoing formation: Coup of 1953
- Predecessor: Qavam (V)
- Successor: Zahedi

The premiership of Mohammad Mosaddegh began when his first government was formed on 28 April 1951 and ended on 19 August 1953, when his second government was overthrown by the American–British backed coup d'état. During the time, the two cabinets of Mosaddegh took control except for a brief period between 16 and 21 July 1952, in which Ahmad Qavam was the Prime Minister, taking office due to resignation of Mosaddegh from premiership and deposed by Shah after five days of mass demonstrations.

== First cabinet ==
Portfolio	Minister	Took office	Left office	Party
Prime Minister	Mohammad Mosaddegh	28 April 1951	16 July 1952	NF
Foreign Minister	Bagher Kazemi	28 April 1951	16 July 1952	NF
War Minister	Ali-Asghar Naghdi	28 April 1951	16 December 1951	Military
War Minister	Morteza Yazdanpanah	16 December 1951	16 July 1952	Military
Interior Minister	Fazlollah Zahedi	28 April 1951	5 August 1951	Military
Interior Minister	Shamseddin Amir-Alaei	5 August 1951	16 December 1951	NF
Interior Minister	Amirteymour Kalali	16 December 1951	16 July 1952	NF
Justice Minister	Ali Heyat	28 April 1951	16 December 1951	Independent
Justice Minister	Shamseddin Amir-Alaei	16 December 1951	16 July 1952	NF
Labor Minister	Amirteymour Kalali	28 April 1951	16 July 1952	NF
National Economy Minister	Shamseddin Amir-Alaei	28 April 1951	5 August 1951	NF
National Economy Minister	Ali Amini	5 August 1951	16 July 1952	Independent
Public Health Minister	Hassan Loghman-Adham	28 April 1951	4 October 1951	Independent
Public Health Minister	Mohammad-Ali Maleki	4 October 1951	16 July 1952	Independent
Roads Minister	Javad Bushehri	28 April 1951	16 July 1952	Independent
Agriculture Minister	Hassan-Ali Farmand	28 April 1951	6 May 1951	Independent
Agriculture Minister	Khalil Taleghani	6 May 1951	16 July 1952	NF
Culture Minister	Karim Sanjabi	28 April 1951	6 May 1951	NF
Culture Minister	Mahmoud Hessabi	6 May 1951	16 July 1952	Independent
Finance Minister	Mohammad Ali Varasteh	28 April 1951	4 October 1951	Independent
Finance Minister	Mahmoud Nariman	4 October 1951	16 July 1952	NF
Post & Telegraph Minister	Yousef Moshar	28 April 1951	6 May 1951	NF
Post & Telegraph Minister	Gholam Hossein Sadighi	6 May 1951	16 July 1952	NF

== Second cabinet ==
Portfolio	Minister	Took office	Left office	Party
Prime Minister	Mohammad Mosaddegh	21 July 1952	19 August 1953	NF
Foreign Minister	Hossein Navab	21 July 1952	16 September 1952	Independent
Foreign Minister	Hossein Fatemi	16 September 1952	19 August 1953	NF
National Defense Minister	Mohammad Mosaddegh	21 July 1952	19 August 1953	NF
Interior Minister	Gholam Hossein Sadighi	21 July 1952	19 August 1953	NF
Justice Minister	Abdolali Lotfi	21 July 1952	19 August 1953	Independent
Labor Minister	Ibrahim Alemi	21 July 1952	19 August 1953	NF
National Economy Minister	Ali-Akbar Akhavi	21 July 1952	19 August 1953	Independent
Public Health Minister	Sabar Farmanfarmaian	21 July 1952	19 August 1953	Independent
Roads Minister	Davoud Rajabi	21 July 1952	6 January 1953	NF
Roads Minister	Jahangir Haghshenas	6 January 1953	19 August 1953	NF
Agriculture Minister	Khalil Taleghani	21 July 1952	19 August 1953	NF
Culture Minister	Mehdi Azar	21 July 1952	19 August 1953	NF
Finance Minister	Bagher Kazemi	21 July 1952	19 August 1953	NF
Post & Telegraph Minister	Seyfollah Moazzami	21 July 1952	19 August 1953	NF

== See also ==
- Nationalization of the Iranian oil industry
