= Conscription in Iran =

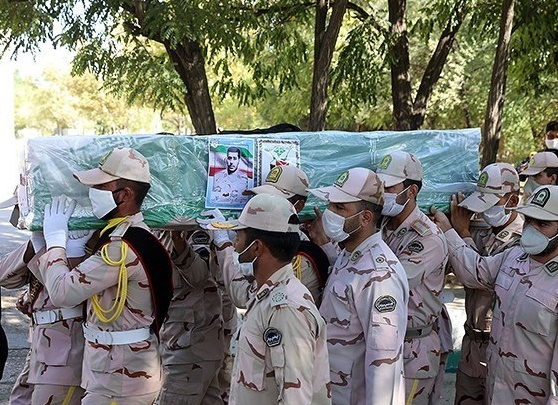
Iranian soldiers at the funeral of their comrade who was killed at the age of 18 during a conflict with smugglers

All young men who reach the age of 18 must spend about two years of compulsory military service (Persian: سرباز, romanized: sarbazi) in the Islamic Republic of Iran Armed Forces (Iranian Army, the Islamic Revolutionary Guard Corps or the Police Command). Often, the General Staff of the Armed Forces chooses where people will serve, and a person cannot choose where to serve. The length of conscription is between 18 months to 2 years.

Before the 1979 revolution, women who completed high school or university were also forced to serve in the non-military branches like as Science Corps and Hygiene Corps . However, after the establishment of the Islamic Republic, some Ayatollahs considered women's military service to be disrespectful to women by the Pahlavi government and banned women's military service in Iran. Therefore, Iranian women and girls were completely exempted from military service, which caused Iranian men and boys to oppose. In 2023, the military is undergoing the process of relaxing the ban on women's military service.

In Iran, men who refuse to go to military service are deprived of their citizenship rights, such as employment, health insurance, continuing their education at university, finding a job, going abroad, opening a bank account, etc. Iranian boys have so far opposed mandatory military service and demanded that military service in Iran become a job like in other countries, but the Islamic Republic is opposed to this demand. Some Iranian military commanders consider the elimination of conscription or improving the condition of soldiers as a security issue and one of Iran’s Supreme Leader’s (formerly Ali Khamenei's) powers as the commander-in-chief of the Armed Forces, so they treat it with caution. In Iran, usually prosperous and wealthy people are exempted from conscription. Some other boys can be exempted from conscription due to their fathers served in the Iran-Iraq war.

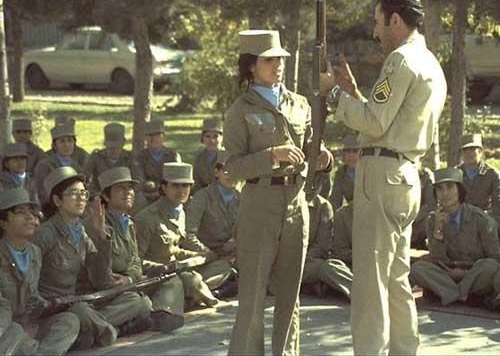
Women's military service before the Iranian Revolution. After the establishment of the Islamic Republic, women are exempted from conscription

This period for military service is divided into two parts; The basic training period is about 2 months in some determined garrisons, and after that, they are sent to their main destination garrison. The conscripts do not have any authority to select the branches for serving this compulsory period. When the applicants submit their applications, the Armed Forces decides to assign them to different organizations based on their needs and availability. These garrisons belong to different branches consisting of the Islamic Republic of Iran Army (Artesh): Ground Forces, Navy, Air Force, Air Defense Force; Islamic Revolutionary Guard Corps (IRGC): Ground Forces, Navy, Aerospace Force, Quds Force. There is also non-military civilian service (امریه سرباز, amriyeh sarbazi) as a substitute for military service.

== History ==
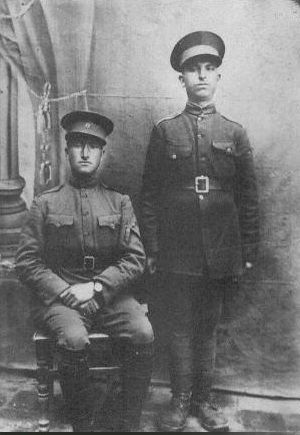
Iranian soldier with his commander (1950s)

Conscription was first introduced by Reza Shah in June 1925 and approved as law by the National Consultative Assembly. At that time every male person who had reached 21 years old must serve in the military for 2 years. However, as the country needed 100,000 men and the qualified population then was 1,000,000, they announced just one man between every 10 men must serve in the military.

== Conscription time ==
Conscription time is shown in months in each year:

== Female Conscription ==
Before the 1979 Iranian Revolution, both men and women were conscripted. Post-revolution, the law changed and women were no longer subject to conscription.

== Gallery ==
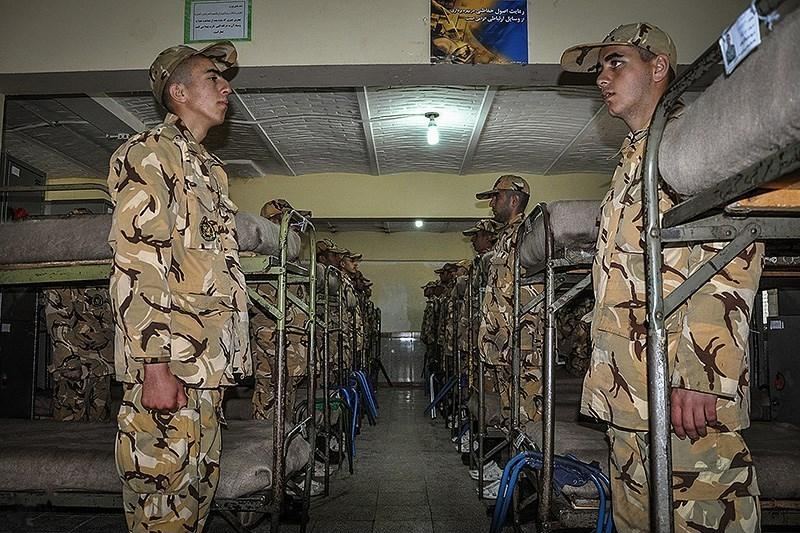
Soldiers in the army ground force dormitory

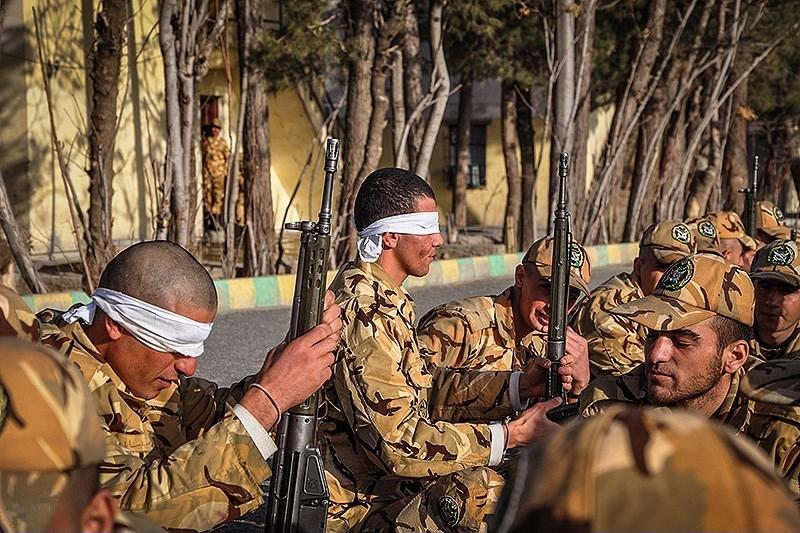
Soldiers of the army ground forces in the barracks

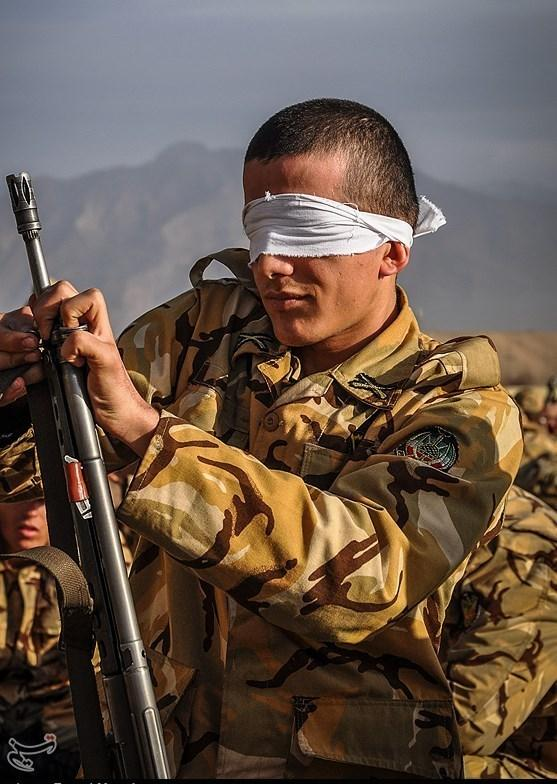
A soldier assembling and disassembling his gun parts with closed eyes

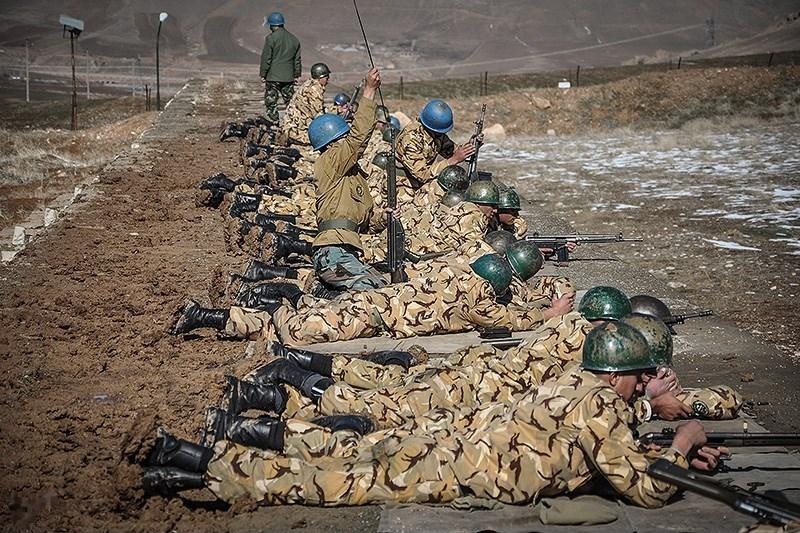
shooting practice

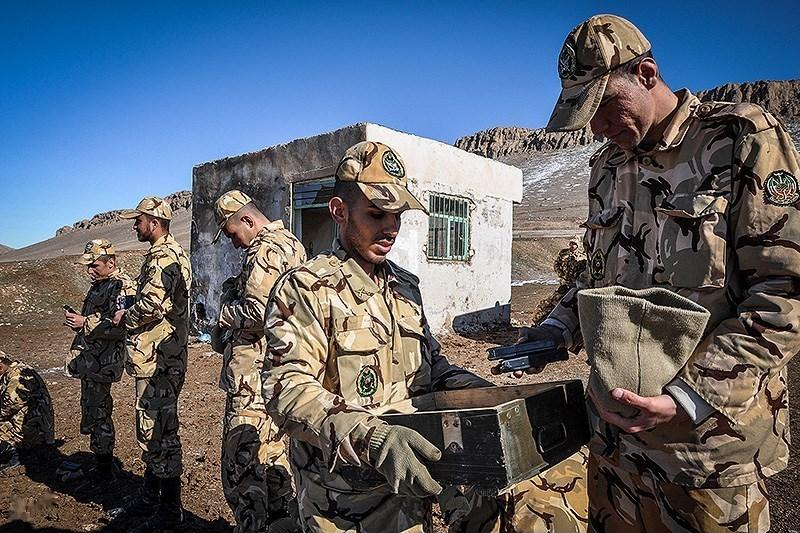
Bringing a gun magazine

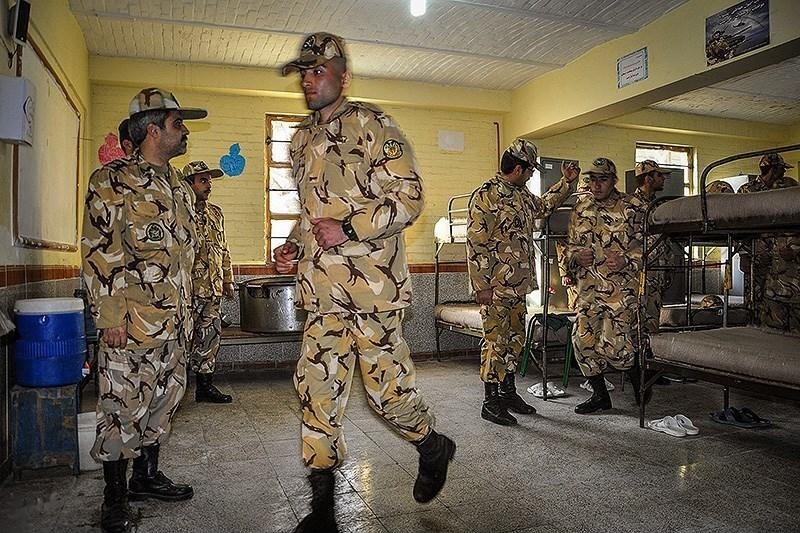
Military alert in the barracks

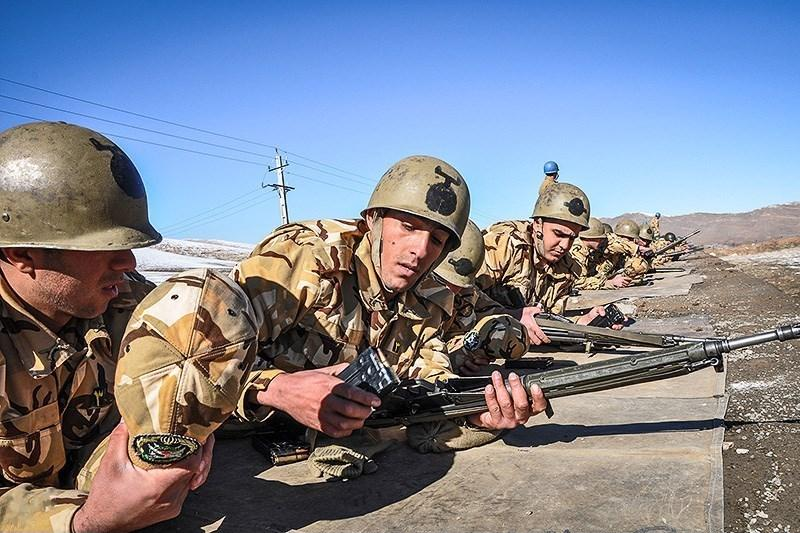
skeeting

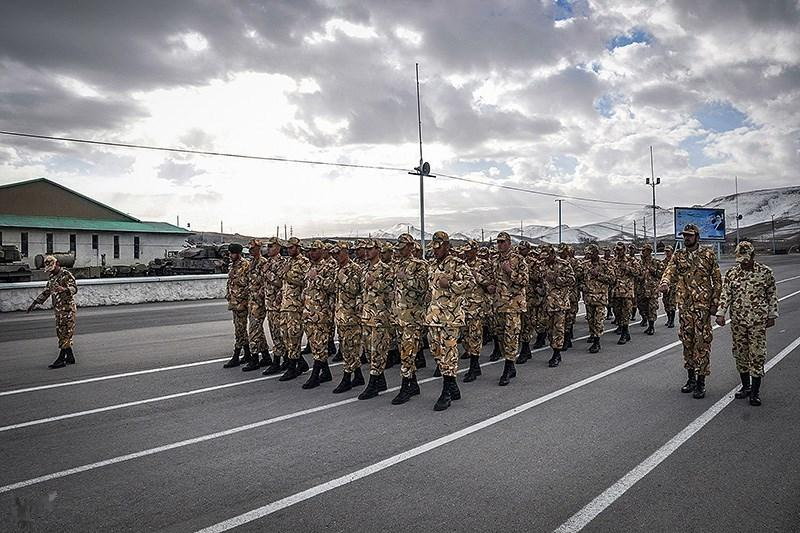
Soldiers in a training marching (Kermanshah, Iran)
