= Javad Bushehri =

Iranian businessman and statesman (1893–1972)

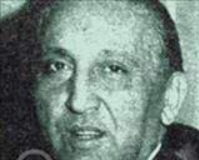

Minister of Roads
- In office 1951 – June 1952
- Monarch: Mohammad Reza Pahlavi
- Prime Minister: Mohammad Mosaddegh

Minister of Agriculture
- In office 1948–1948
- Monarch: Mohammad Reza Pahlavi
- Prime Minister: Abdolhossein Hazhir

Personal details
- Born: 1893 Bushehr, Sublime State of Iran
- Died: 1972 (aged 78–79)
- Parent: Haj Mohammad Moin Al Tajjar (father)

Javad Bushehri (Persian: جواد بوشهری; 1893–1972), also known as Amir Homayun, was an Iranian businessman and statesman who held several government posts. In addition, he served at the Majlis and Senate and also, was the governor of the Fars province.

== Early life and education ==
Javad Busehri was born in Bushehr in 1893. His father, Haj Mohammad Mo'in-al-Tojjar, was a businessman. After receiving education in his hometown Javad Busehri attended a German school in Tehran. Then he studied trade and economics in England and Switzerland.

== Career and activities ==
Following his return to Iran Bushehri involved in business and politics. During the reign of Reza Shah, he was a member of the Majlis representing Tehran. His relationship with Reza Shah became strained, and Bushehri left Iran for Europe due to his fear of being arrested by the Shah. He could only return to Iran after Reza Shah's abdication.

Bushehri was appointed governor of the Fars province and was then made the minister of agriculture in the cabinet of Prime Minister Abdolhossein Hazhir in 1948. The same year, he was also elected to the Senate, but resigned from the post soon.

Bushehri was the minister of roads in the cabinet led by Prime Minister Mohammad Mosaddegh in the period 1951–1952. He also served as the spokesman of the Mosaddegh government.

In 1960, he was vice president of the celebration committee established for the anniversary of the Persian Empire and a senator.

== Personal life and death ==
Bushehri was related to the Pahlavi family in that his nephew, Mehdi Bushehri, was the third husband of Princess Ashraf, sister of Shah Mohammad Reza Pahlavi. He died in 1972.
