= Ibrahim Alemi =

Iranian politician and jurist

Ibrahim Alemi was an Iranian jurist and politician. He received his degree in law in France. He served as the minister of labour in the cabinet of Mohammad Mosaddegh between November 1951 and August 1953. The British officials described Alemi as the most loyal minister in the cabinet.
