= Shamseddin Amir-Alai =

Iranian politician and diplomat (1900–1994)

- Born: 1900; Tehran, Sublime State of Persia
- Died: August 1994 (aged 93–94); Tehran, Iran
- Resting place: Behesht e Zahra cemetery, Tehran, Iran
- Political party: National Front
- Parent: Ali Akbar Khan Najd al Saltanah (Father)

Shamseddin Amir-Alai (Persian: شمس‌الدین امیرعلائی; 1900–August 1994) was an Iranian politician who served as both interior minister and justice minister in the first cabinet of Mohammad Mosaddegh. He also held other government and diplomatic posts.

== Early life and education ==
Amir-Alai was born in Tehran in 1900. His father was Ali Akbar Khan Najd al Saltanah. He received a bachelor's degree in finance and administration from a European university. In 1964, he obtained his PhD in political science in Paris.

== Career and activities ==
Following his return to Iran Amir-Alai worked at the Ministry of Post and then, at the Ministry of Justice. In the latter he served as a judge. Later he worked at the Ministry of Agriculture as a senior official. In February 1946, he was named as the minister of agriculture after serving as acting minister in the cabinet led by Prime Minister Ahmad Qavam.

Amir-Alai joined the National Front established by Mohammad Mosaddegh and was one of the individuals who signed the Charter of the Front in February 1949. Amir-Alai held several government positions during Mossadegh's premiership. He was the minister of interior in the first cabinet of Mosaddegh and the minister of justice in his second cabinet. Then he was appointed by Mosaddegh as the ambassador of Iran to Belgium.

At the beginning of 1950s he was appointed governor of Gilan during the premiership of Ali Razmara. Razmara's successor Hossein Ala' named Amir-Alai as minister of justice in March 1951. In May 1955, Amir-Alai and four other political figures, including Bagher Kazemi, who were all close to Mosaddegh were arrested on the orders of the military governor of Tehran, Teymur Bakhtiar.

Following the regime change in Iran in 1979, Amir-Alai was appointed ambassador of Iran to France, but he resigned from the post in 1980 due to his conflict with the foreign minister, Sadegh Ghotbzadeh. Later Amir-Alai became an opposition leader.

== Death and funeral ==
Amir-Alai died in a car accident outside his home in August 1994 which is considered by the Iranian opposition as mysterious. His funeral ceremony was held on 11 August 1994, and he was buried in Behesht-e Zahra cemetery.

During his funeral another leading opposition figure, Dariush Forouhar, was abducted by the Iranian intelligence personnel.
