= Abdolali Lotfi =

Iranian judge and politician (1880–1956)

- عبدالعلی لطفی
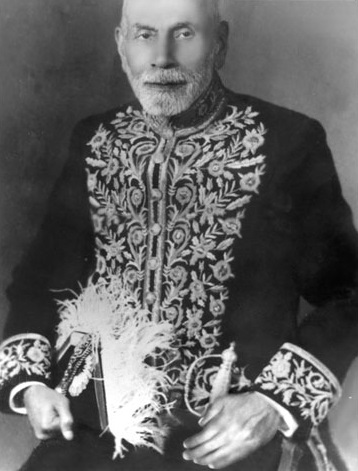

Minister of Justice
- In office 21 July 1952 – 19 August 1953
- Prime Minister: Mohammad Mosaddegh

Personal details
- Born: 1880 Amol, Iran
- Died: 1956 (aged 75–76) Tehran, Iran
- Party: Democrat Party; Iran Party

Abdolali Lotfi, also known as Sheikh Abdolali Khan, (23 January 1880–15 September 1956) was an Iranian politician and judge. He was the minister of justice in the second cabinet of Prime Minister Mohammad Mosaddegh. Lotfi also served as the chief of the general inspection office.

Just before the coup d'état in 1953 the Western publications, including Newsweek, reported that Lotfi was one of communists who were dangerous threats for Iran. The other cabinet members who were also regarded as communist threats were Mehdi Azar and Hossein Fatemi. On 2 September 1953 Lotfi and Mehdi Azar were arrested by the military governorate. Lotfi was sentenced to prison terms. After being released from the prison Lotfi was attacked by the anti-Mosaddegh groups and died following the incident.

== See also ==
- Pahlavi dynasty
