= Mehdi Azar =

Iranian physician and politician (1901–1994)

- Occupation: Physician
- Known for: Founder of the first dialysis ward in Iran
- Medical career
- Institutions: University of Tehran
- Sub-specialties: Kidney disease

Minister of Culture
- In office July 1952 – August 1953
- Prime Minister: Mohammad Mosaddegh

Personal details
- Born: 1901
- Died: 1994 (aged 92–93) Norfolk, Virginia, USA
- Party: National Front
- Parent: Haj Mirza Ali Tabrizi (father)
- Education: Tehran Medical School; University of Lyon

Mehdi Azar (1901–1994) was an Iranian physician, professor of medicine and politician who served as the minister of culture in the period 1952–1953. In addition to his political activities he was one of the leading Iranian physicians in kidney disease.

== Early life and education ==
Azar was born in 1901. His father was Haj Mirza Ali Tabrizi who was a cleric and a deputy in the Majlis.

Azar graduated from Tehran Medical School in 1928 and also, from the University of Lyon.

== Career ==
Azar was a faculty member at the University of Tehran. He joined the National Front established by Mohammad Mosaddegh. Azar was its secretary for foreign relations. In 1949 he was imprisoned due to his political activities. He was appointed minister of culture in the second cabinet of Mosaddegh in July 1952. Azar was one of the cabinet members who were claimed by the Western publications, including Newsweek, to be communist threats for Iran. The others were Hossein Fatemi and Abdol Ali Lofti. Azar was in office until August 1953 when the cabinet was overthrown through a coup. Azar and Abdol Ali Lotfi were arrested by the military governorate on 2 September 1953.

Following his retirement from politics Azar continued his profession as a physician specialized in kidney disease among adults. He was the founder of the first dialysis ward in Iran which was established at Pahlavi Hospital.

== Personal life and death ==
Azar went into exile in the United States in 1982 and settled in Norfolk, Virginia. He died there in 1994 and was buried in Iran.
