= Hossein Fatemi =

Iranian politician (1917–1954)

Seyyed Hossein Fatemi
- حسین فاطمی
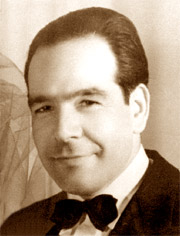

Minister of Foreign Affairs
- In office 16 September 1952 – 19 August 1953
- Monarch: Mohammad Reza Pahlavi
- Prime Minister: Mohammad Mosaddegh
- Preceded by: Hossein Navab
- Succeeded by: Abdolhossein Meftah

Member of the Parliament
- In office 27 April 1952 – 16 September 1952
- Constituency: Tehran

Personal details
- Born: 10 February 1917 Nain, Guarded Domains of Iran
- Died: 10 November 1954 (aged 37) Tehran, Imperial State of Iran
- Cause of death: Execution by firing squad
- Party: National Front
- Spouse: Parivash Satvati (m. 1951)
- Children: 1
- Education: University of Tehran

Hossein Fatemi (Persian: حسین فاطمی; also Romanized as Hoseyn Fātemi; 10 February 1917 – 10 November 1954) was an Iranian scholar. A close associate of Prime Minister Mohammad Mosaddegh, he proposed nationalization of Iranian oil and gas assets. Initially a journalist, he served as minister of foreign affairs from 1951 to 1953. After the 1953 coup d'état toppled the government of Mosaddegh, Fatemi was arrested, tortured, and convicted by a military court of "treason against the Shah", and executed by a firing squad.

== Early life and education ==
Fatemi was born in Nain on 10 February 1917, the youngest of five. He was educated in his hometown. In his teens he moved to Isfahan for higher education. He was a caustic critic of the Iranian monarch Rezā Shāh, and his views were candidly reflected in his newspaper editorials. From 1944 to 1948 he studied in France, where he earned a bachelor's degree in journalism. There he also received a doctorate degree in law in 1948.

== Career and activities ==
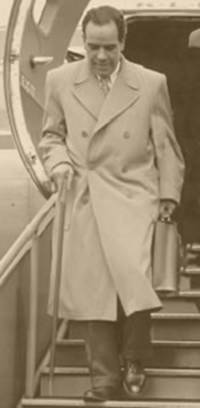
Fatemi after a trip to France

After graduation, Fatemi returned to Iran and became instrumental in launching the daily titled Bākhtar (West) in Isfahan. From its founding in 1949, Fatemi was an active member of the Iranian National Front, the democratic and nationalist movement of Mosaddegh. Later the daily was moved to Tehran and began to be the mouthpiece of the front. He also contributed to a Tehran-based weekly newspaper, Mard-i Imruz, which was owned by his confidant, Mohammad Masud. Fatemi was one of 19 Mosaddegh supporters who organized a protest at the Marble Palace in October 1949 after they could not secure a seat in the Parliament in the elections.

Fatemi served as an assistant to the prime minister and as deputy of Tehran in the Iranian parliament. At the age of 33 he was appointed minister of foreign affairs to the Mosaddegh's cabinet in October 1952. He replaced Hossein Navab in the post. According to Mosaddegh's memoir, published after Fatemi's death, Fatemi was the initiator of the policy of oil nationalization in Iran.

=== Assassination attempt ===
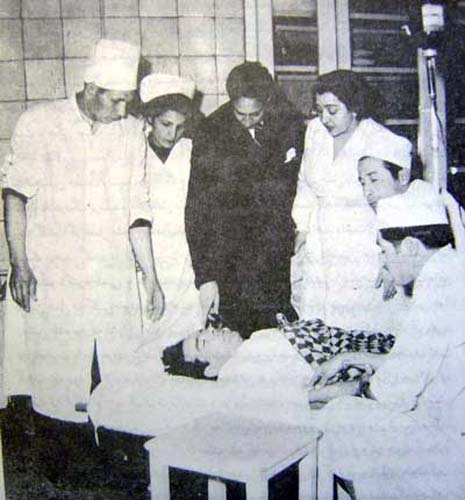
On a hospital bed after a failed assassination (15 February 1952)

On 15 February 1952, Fatemi was delivering a formal speech at the grave of the journalist Mohammad Masud who had been assassinated in 1948. There Fatemi became the target of an unsuccessful assassination by Mohammad-Mehdi Abdekhodaei of the Fadayan-e Islam, which also had planned to assassinate Mosaddegh. In the shooting attack, Fatemi suffered serious injuries which sidelined him for the next seven or eight months, and left permanent wounds.

== Arrest and execution ==
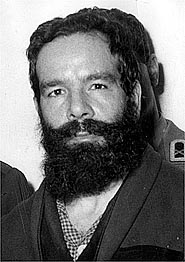
Hossein Fatemi after his arrest

In August 1953, Mosaddegh's government was overthrown by a spontaneous uprising of Iranians on 18 August. Just before the uprising, the Western publications, including Newsweek, reported that Fatemi was one of the communists who were dangerous threats for Iran. The other cabinet members who were also regarded as communist threats were Mehdi Azar and Abdol Ali Lofti.

On 15 August, Fatemi was to be arrested along with Mosaddegh and other close associates, but the first U.S.-led coup attempt failed. Fatemi was arrested by a Royalist group of officers and soldiers who were in such a hurry that he was not allowed to put shoes on, but he was eventually released and went directly to Mosaddegh's residence. Fearful of the apparent failure of the coup, Mohammad Reza Pahlavi immediately fled to Baghdad. In the morning after the first coup attempt, while Mosaddegh still remained a strong proponent of constitutional monarchy, Fatemi advised Mosaddegh to declare a republic in light of the failed coup attempt. In the evening of that same day, Fatemi, in a fiery editorial in his newspaper Bakhtar-e Emruz and a public speech, denounced the Shah as "capricious and bloodthirsty", a "servant of the British", and a "thief of Baghdad". On 19 August, the offices of Fatemi's newspaper were attacked and burnt down by mobs incited by an Iranian CIA agent. Later that day the second coup attempt succeeded. With Mosaddegh arrested, Fatemi went underground, taking shelter in a Tudeh safe house.

Fatemi began to write his memoir, but after 204 days of concealment, he was discovered and arrested on 13 March 1954. During his capture the forces killed his sister, Saltanate Banoo, who attempted to save Fatemi. He was then tortured and convicted by a military court on 10 October for "treason against the Shah" and sentenced to death. Diminishing his role in Fatemi's execution, Mohammad Reza Shah wrote in his posthumously published book Answer to History that, "I was unable to prevent the execution of Hossein Fatemi, Mossadegh’s Foreign Minister, because he was a communist."

Fatemi was executed by firing squad at Ghasr barracks at 6 am on 10 November 1954 in Tehran, when he was still suffering from fever and the injuries of the unsuccessful attempt of assassination on him by Fadayan-e Islam. Fatemi was buried in Ebn-e Babooyeh cemetery in Shahr-e Ray, near Tehran.

== Personal life ==
Hossein Fatemi married Parivash Satvati on 27 November 1951. Fatemi was 15 years older than her. She was the daughter of an army general and the sister of Manijeh Rahimi who was the widow of Mehdi Rahimi, an executed military officer following the Iranian revolution.

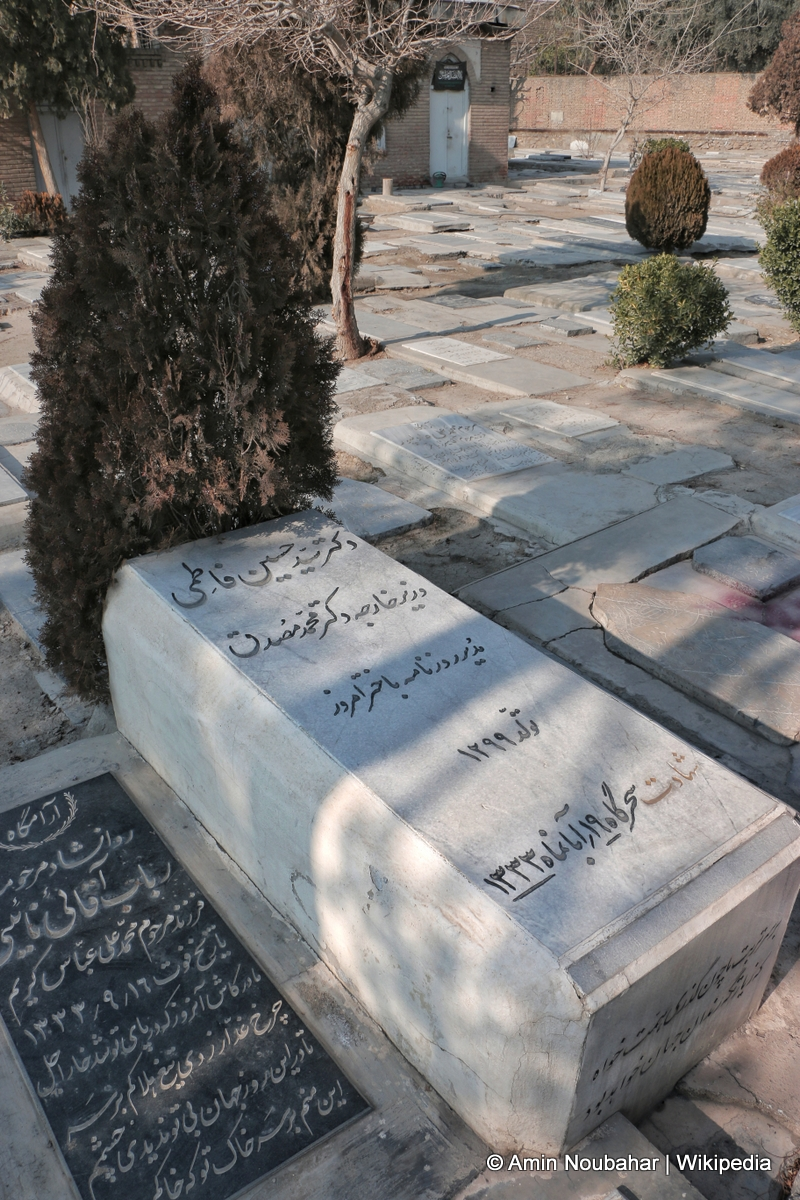
Grave of Fatemi in Ibn Babawayh Cemetery

Fatemi and his wife had a son who was seven-month old when Fatemi was executed. Parivash Satvati left Iran following the killing of her husband and settled in the United Kingdom with her son.

== Legacy ==
There is an avenue in Tehran named after Fatemi. Mossadegh often quoted Fatemi as the force behind the nationalization of oil from inception to implementation. After the 1953 CIA-MI6 coup, the Shah returned half of oil and gas rights, mainly to US-UK oil companies, with a few percents for French and Italian ones, under a new agreement known as the Oil Consortium. Other countries in the Persian Gulf and North Africa followed the example and took national ownership of oil and gas fields. President Nasser of Egypt was influenced by the earlier example of Fatemi's thesis carried out by Mossadegh when he nationalized the Suez canal.

== See also ==
- Anglo-Iranian Oil Company
