= 1963 Iranian referendum =

Referendum regarding the White Revolution

White Revolution referendum
- 26 January 1963
- "White Revolution of the Shah and the People": 1. Abolition of the landowner–tenant system by land reform 2. Nationalization of forests and pastures 3. Sale of government factories for the purpose of financing land reform 4. Making workers shareholders of factories they worked in 5. Reform of electoral laws 6. Creation of the Literacy Corps

Results
Choice	Votes	%
Yes	5,589,711	99.93%
No	4,115	0.07%
Valid votes	5,593,826	100.00%
Invalid or blank votes	0	0.00%
Total votes	5,593,826	100.00%
Registered voters/turnout	6,098,277	91.73%
- 271,179 announced additional votes cast by women were counted separately but not considered in the official results

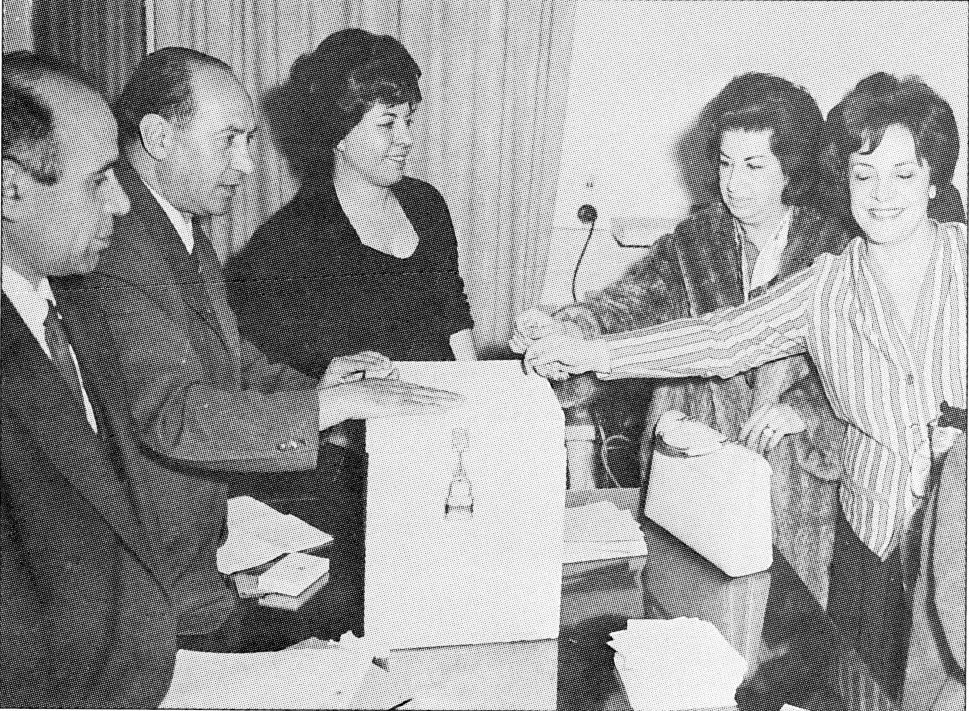
Women voting in the referendum

A referendum was held in Iran on 26 January 1963 by the decree of Mohammad Reza Shah, with an aim to show popular support for him, asking voters to approve or veto the reforms of the White Revolution.

Women were not officially allowed to vote, but were set up to vote at their own balloting counters and dedicated boxes, at the suggestion of Ministry of Agriculture Hasan Arsanjani. The results gave Iranian women the right to vote.

== Criticism ==
Despite the apparent benign nature of the proposals in the referendum, there was significant opposition. Opponents included major landowners, ulema and communists.

Ayatollah Ruhollah Khomeini called for boycotting the referendum as "un-Islamic".

National Front boycotted the referendum, criticizing that the measures did not come from the parliament.

Voters were asked six questions, but had only the option to vote yes or no to the total package.

The ballots for 'Yes' were white, while the negative ones were green.

Similar to the previous referendum, polling places lacked secrecy and there were two separate voting booths: one for the supporters and one for the opponents. "No sane man would enter the opposition booth", according to Mohammad Gholi Majd.

== Party policies ==
Position	Organization	Ref
Yes	Nationalists’ Party	
Yes	People's Party	
Yes	Pan-Iranist Party	
Boycott	National Front	
Boycott	Freedom Movement	

== Results ==
Choice	Votes	%
For	5,589,711	99.9
Against	4,115	0.1
Abstain	0	0
Total votes	5,593,826	100
Registered voters	6,098,277	—
Source: Nohlen et al. and Zonis

== Aftermath ==
Following the referendum, dissension and riots broke out in almost all major urban areas, most significantly in Tehran and Qom. The Shah gave orders for the immediate suppression of the opposition. The National Front, the Freedom Movement, the Tudeh Party, as well as religious activists were imprisoned. The unrest made Ayatollah Ruhollah Khomeini the regime's principal opponent in the minds of many Iranians.
