= White Revolution =

1963–1979 reforms by the Shah of Iran

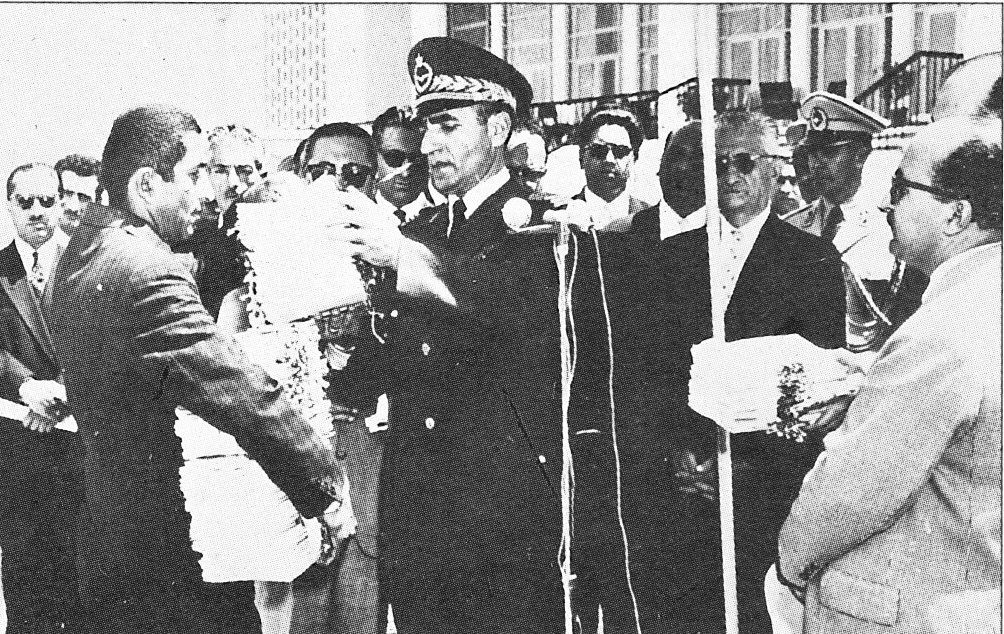
Mohammad Reza Pahlavi, the Shah of Iran hands out documents of ownership of land to new owners during the White Revolution's land reform, 1963

The White Revolution (Persian: انقلاب سفید, romanized: Enqelâb-e Sefid) or the Shah and People Revolution (Persian: انقلاب شاه و مردم, romanized: Enqelâb-e Šâh o Mardom) was a series of reforms to modernize the Imperial State of Iran launched on 26 January 1963 by the Shah, Mohammad Reza Pahlavi, and ended with his overthrow in 1979. Among the elements of the Revolution were land reform where landlords were compensated for their land by shares of privatized state-owned factories, expanded road, rail, and air network, dam and irrigation projects, work to eradicate diseases such as malaria, promotion of industrial growth and profit-sharing schemes for workers, enfranchisement of women, nationalization of forests and pastures, literacy and health corps for isolated rural areas.

The bulk of the program was aimed at Iran's peasantry, while redistributing the aristocrat landlord class wealth down to working-class Iranians. Through land reform, the Shah hoped to ally himself with the peasantry in the countryside, and to sever their ties with the aristocracy in the city.

In order to legitimize the White Revolution, the Shah called for a national referendum in early 1963 in which 5,598,711 people voted for the reforms and 4,115 voted against the reforms, even though the referendum was boycotted by opponents of the Shah.

In subsequent decades, per capita income for Iranians greatly increased, and petroleum export revenue fueled an enormous increase in state funding for industrial development projects, economic growth, rapid urbanization, spread of literacy, and dissolution of Iran's feudalist customs.

However, the revolution also aroused the antagonism of the Ulama (Islamic clergy) led by Ruhollah Khomeini, the future leader of the 1979 Islamic Revolution, who opposed the erosion of their traditional bases of power, and met with difficulties from a high failure rate for new farms and an exodus of agricultural workers to Iran's major cities.

== Reforms ==
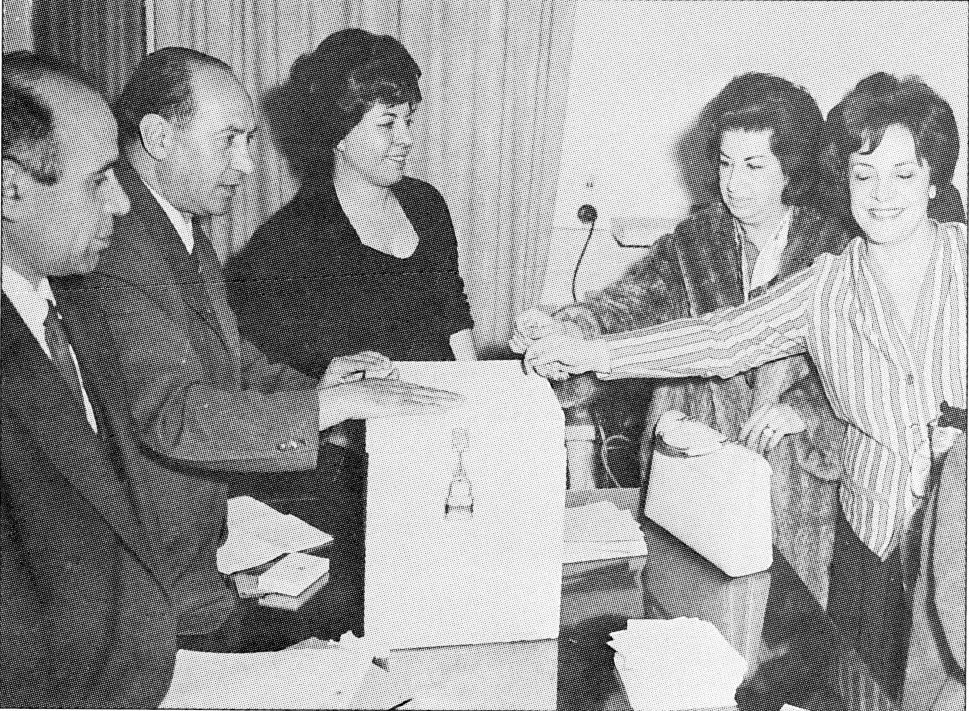
Women voting for the first time in 1963

The Shah had intended it to be a non-violent regeneration of Iranian society through economic and social reforms, with the ultimate long-term aim of transforming Iran into a global economic and industrial power. The Shah introduced economic concepts such as profit-sharing for workers and initiated massive government-financed heavy industry projects, as well as the nationalization of forests and pastureland. Most important, however, were the land reform programs which saw the traditional landed elites of Iran lose much of their influence and power. Nearly 90% of Iranian sharecroppers became landowners as a result.

Socially, the platform granted women more rights and poured money into education, especially in the rural areas. The Iranian Science Corps, known as the Literacy Corps was established, which allowed young men to fulfil their compulsory military service by working as village literacy teachers.

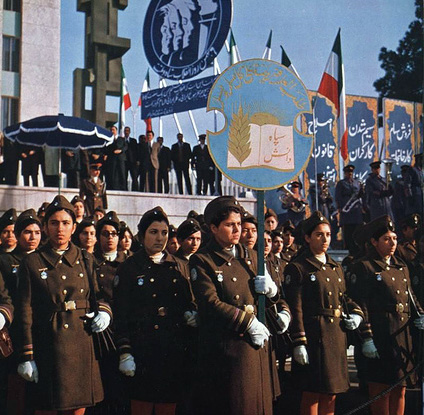
Uniformed women of the Literacy Corps outside the Iranian Senate building.

The White Revolution consisted of 19 elements that were introduced over a period of 16 years, with the first six introduced on January 9, 1963, and put to a national referendum on January 26, 1963:

1. Land Reforms Program and Abolishing "Feudalism": The government bought the land during the Iranian Land Reform from the feudal landlords at what was considered to be a fair price and sold it to the peasants at 30% below the market value, with the loan being payable over 25 years at very low interest rates. This made it possible for 1.5 million peasant families who had once been little more than serfs to own the lands that they had been cultivating all their lives. Given that the average size of a peasant family was five, the land reforms program brought freedom to approximately nine million people, or 40% of Iran's population.
2. Nationalization of Forests and Pasturelands: Many measures were introduced, not only to protect the national resources and stop the destruction of forests and pasturelands, but also to further develop and cultivate them. More than 9 million trees were planted in 26 regions, creating 70,000 acres (280 km^{2}) of "green belts" around cities and on the borders of the major highways. While the Caspian forests were nationalized, the forest inhabitants—primarily cattle herders—were expelled by the government and relocated to nearby villages.
3. Privatization of the Government Owned Enterprises, selling shares in manufacturing plants and factories to the public and the old feudal lords, thus creating a whole new class of factory owners who could now help to industrialize the country.
4. Profit Sharing for industrial workers in private sector enterprises, giving the factory workers and employees 20% share of the net profits of the places where they worked and securing bonuses based on higher productivity or reductions in costs.
5. Extending the Right to Vote to Women, who previously did not enjoy this right. This measure was opposed by the Ulama.
6. Formation of the Literacy Corps, so that those who had a high school diploma and were required to serve their country as soldiers could do so by fighting illiteracy in the villages. In 1963, approximately 2/3 of the population was illiterate, with the remaining third found mainly in the capital city of Tehran.
7. Formation of the Health Corps to extend public health care throughout the villages and rural regions of Iran. In 3 years, almost 4,500 medical groups were trained; nearly 10 million cases were treated by the Corps.
8. Formation of the Reconstruction and Development Corps to teach the villagers the modern methods and techniques of farming and keeping livestock. Agricultural production between 1964 and 1970 increased by 80% in tonnage and 67% in value.
9. Formation of the Houses of Equity where 5 village elders would be elected by the villagers, for a period of 3 years, to act as arbitrators in order to help settle minor offences and disputes. By 1977 there were 10,358 Houses of Equity serving over 10 million people living in over 19,000 villages across the country.
10. Nationalization of all Water Resources, introduction of projects and policies in order to conserve and benefit from Iran's limited water resources. Many dams were constructed and five more were under construction in 1978. A result of these measures was the area of land under irrigation increased from 2 million acres (8,000 km^{2}), in 1968, to 5.6 million in 1977.
11. Urban and Rural Modernization and Reconstruction with the help of the Reconstruction and Development Corps. Building of public baths, schools and libraries; installing water pumps and power generators for running water and electricity.
12. Didactic Reforms that improved the quality of education by diversifying the curriculum in order to adapt to the necessities of life in the modern world.
13. Workers' Right to Own Shares in the Industrial Complexes where they worked by turning industrial units, with 5 years history and over, into public companies, where up to 99% of the shares in the state-owned enterprises and 49% of the shares of the private companies would be offered for sale to the workers of the establishment at first and then to the general public.
14. Price Stabilization and campaign against unreasonable profiteering (1975). Owners of factories and large chain stores were heavily fined, with some being imprisoned and other's licenses being revoked. Sanctions were imposed on multi-national foreign companies and tons of merchandise stored for speculative purposes were confiscated and sold to consumers at fixed prices.
15. Free and Compulsory Education and a daily free meal for all children from kindergarten to 14 years of age. Primary schools were built in hundreds of villages that previously did not have one. In 1978, 25% of Iranians were enrolled in public schools alone. In that same year there were 185,000 students of both sexes studying in Iran's universities. In addition to the above there were over 100,000 students pursuing their studies abroad, of which 50,000 were enrolled in colleges and universities in the United States.
16. Free Food for Needy Mothers and for all newborn babies up to the age of two.
17. Introduction of Social Security and National Insurance for all Iranians. The National Insurance system provided for up to 100% of the wages during retirement.
18. Stable and Reasonable Cost of Renting or Buying of Residential Properties (1977). Controls were placed on land prices and various forms of land speculation.
19. Introduction of Measures to Fight against Corruption within the bureaucracy. The Imperial Inspection Commission was founded, consisting of representatives from administrative bodies and people of proven integrity.

== Results ==
There was a minor industrial revolution during this period of reform. Port facilities were improved, the Trans-Iranian Railway was expanded, and the main roads connecting Tehran and provincial capitals were asphalted. Many small factories opened up specializing in clothing, food processing, cement, tiles, paper, and home appliances. Larger factories for textiles, machine tools, and car assembly were also opened. Educational institutions also grew after the launching of the White Revolution. Enrollment in kindergarten increased from 13,300 to 221,990, elementary schools from 1,640,000 to 4,080,000, secondary schools from 370,000 to 741,000 and colleges from 24,885 to 145,210. The new schools instituted educational policies designed to undercut clerical control over education and religious education. The Literacy Corps also helped raise the literacy rate from 26 to 42 percent. The White Revolution also included certain reforms of women's rights. Women gained the right to vote, to run for elected office and to serve as lawyers and later judges. The marriageable age for women was also raised to fifteen.

Iran experienced explosive economic expansion with an annual economic growth rate averaging at 9.8%. There was a substantial rise in the Iranian middle class with over one million families becoming small business owners and an estimated 700,000 salaried professionals. The large economic growth was later used to fund arms built up by the Shah who spent billions on purchasing foreign weapons establishing Iran as a geopolitical power. The history of the Persian empire was taught as means to make people feel part of Iran. In the textbook for the third year of high school, for instance, it states that the interference of the Zoroastrian clergy in politics caused the defeat of the Sasanian empire by the Muslim armies. Therefore, religious interference in political affairs was taught to be extremely dangerous.

Economically, the White Revolution was very successful. The White Revolution successfully redistributed land to approximately 2.5 million families, established literacy and health corps targeting Iran's rural areas, and resulted in a slew of social and legal reform. In the decades following the revolution, per capita income for Iranians skyrocketed. The rapid rise in Iran's revenues paved the way for increased state spending used to fund major industrial development projects in Iran.

== Problems and criticism ==
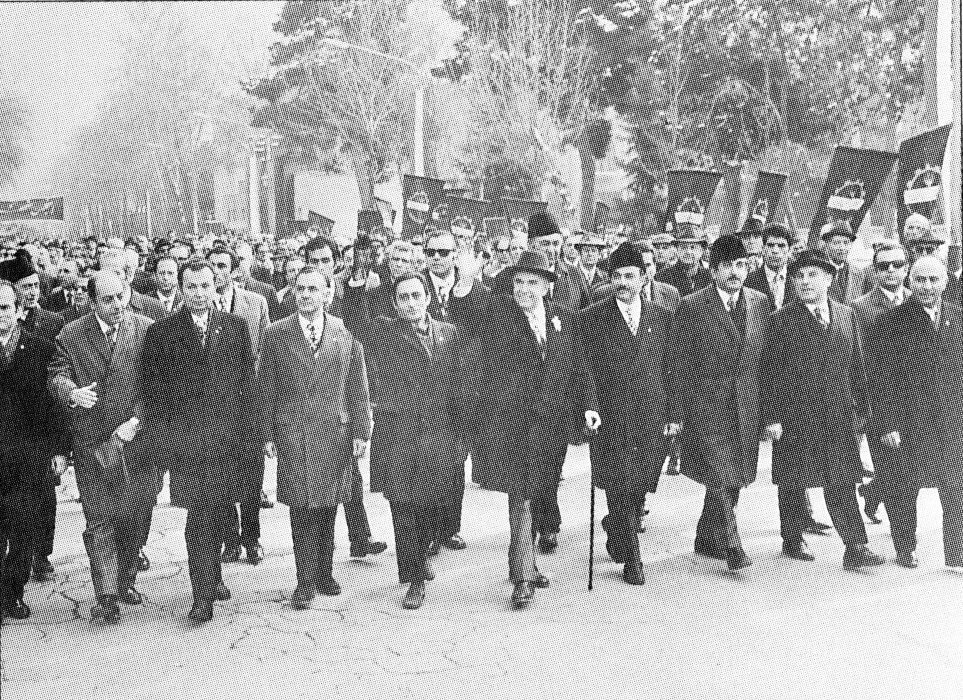
Prime Minister Amir Abbas Hoveida and his cabinet in 11th anniversary of the reforms, 1974

=== Land reform ===
Land reform, which was the focus of the White Revolution, did what it was intended to do – weaken the nobles and landlords. In their place, though, emerged a new group of commercial farmers, and many previously large landowning families, such as the Pahlavi family, managed to renovate themselves into these commercial farmers. A rapid expansion of small landowners did occur, but only about half of the rural population received any land, and many of the people who did receive land did not receive enough to sustain themselves. The result of the White Revolution was that the rural population could be separated into three groups: prosperous farmers, small landowners, and village laborers. The first group was the only group to really benefit from the land reforms, and this group consisted of former village headmen, bailiffs, and some former landlords. The second group consisted of sharecroppers who received no more than 10 hectares of land. Most of these people ended up trading their land in for shares in state cooperatives. The last group received no land at all, and survived as farm hands, laborers, or shepherds. Many of them migrated to urban centers for work.

In late 1978, there had been widespread dissatisfaction among Iranian farmers with regards to land reforms which were supposed to empower them. The Shah's reforms focused on grandiose industrial projects over agriculture, which often lacked trained manpower. Farmers also complained of corruption. Earlier in 1978 for example, a former minister of agriculture and a former undersecretary of agriculture were arrested on suspicion of embezzlement. Emigrations to cities accelerated, and agricultural demand outpaced production. Even though reforms turned many peasants into landowners, it imposed upon them taxes and other costs – such as the purchase of seeds, water, and equipment – that they were not burdened with when they worked for landowners, while also eliminating services such as health and education that were provided for them by landlords under the traditional system. An influx of agricultural imports from US also reduced the farmers' market share.

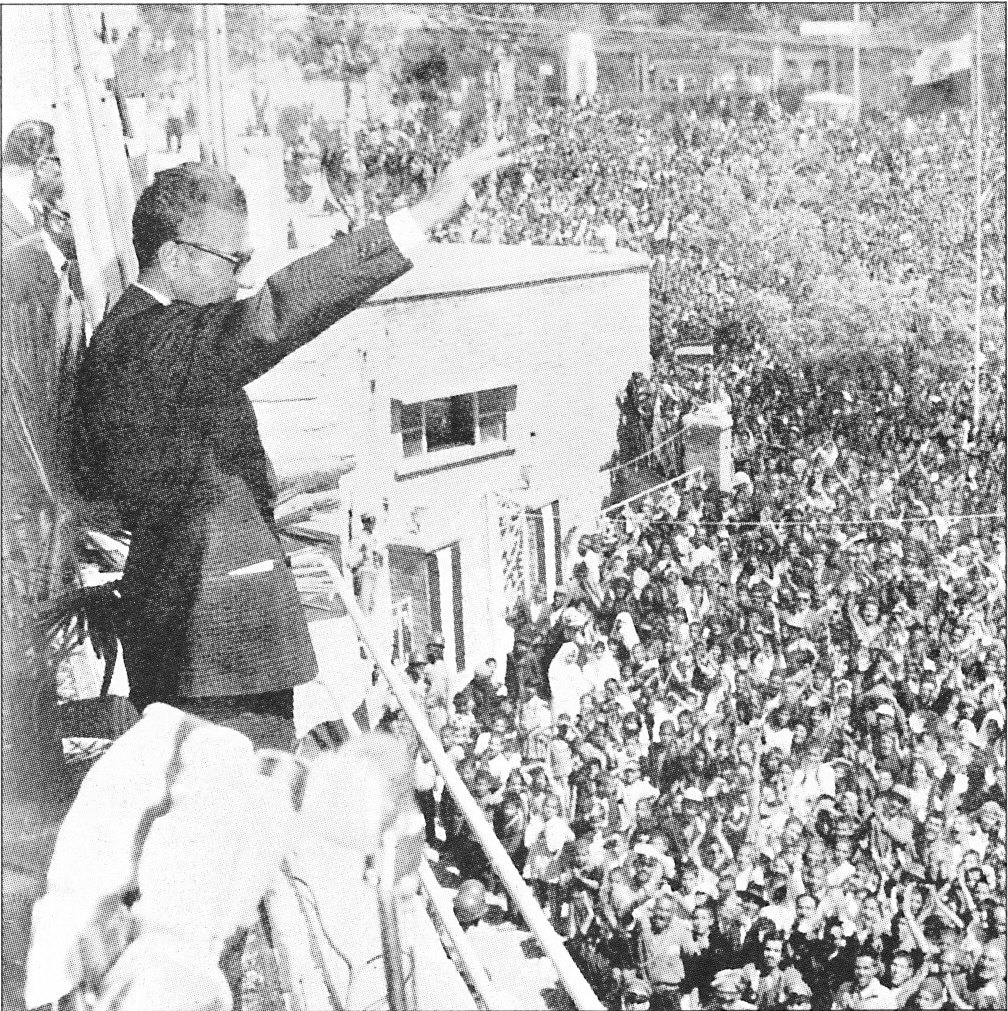
Shah Mohammad Reza Pahlavi speaking about the principles of the White Revolution

=== Critics ===
In the beginning, the White Revolution received most of its criticism from two main groups: the clergy, and the landlords. The landlords were angry about the land reforms because their land was bought by the government and then sold in smaller plots to the citizenry at a lower price.

The powerful Shī'ah clergy were also angered at the reforms that removed much of their traditional powers in the realms of education and family law, as well as lessening their previously strong influence in the rural areas. The White Revolution's emphasis on secular education eroded the Ulama's former monopoly in that field, after the development of secular courts had reduced clerical power over law and jurisprudence.

A large percentage of the upper echelon of the clergy came from landowning families, deeply affected by the reform and much absentee rent income went directly to the clergy and their institutions. The land reforms initiated the breakup of huge areas previously held under charitable trust (vaqf), administered by members of the Ulama and formed a considerable portion of that class’s revenue. The income generated from rents in an estimated 10,000 villages, which helped finance the clerical establishment, were eligible for redistribution.

Ruhollah Khomeini was possibly the most open and vocal opponent to the White Revolution and to the Shah himself. Although the clergy in Iran were not happy about many aspects of the White Revolution, such as granting suffrage to women, the secular local election bill, and land reforms, the clergy as a whole were not actively protesting. Khomeini, on the other hand, actively spoke out against the new reforms and the Shah, having apparently undergone a serious change of thought from the traditional role and practices of Shi’ite clergy. In a speech at Feyziyeh School in June 1963, Khomeini spoke out against the Shah's brutality towards student protests, and for the first time, it was a speech attacking the Shah as a person. This speech did lead to Khomeini's exile, but being outside of Iran did not stop Khomeini's protests, nor did it weaken his influence inside Iran.

Khomeini also attacked provisions of the reforms that would allow members of Iran's non-Muslim minority to be elected or appointed to local offices:

I have repeatedly pointed out that the government has evil intentions and is opposed to the ordinances of Islam. ... The Ministry of Justice has made clear its opposition to the ordinances of Islam by various measures like the abolition of the requirement that judges be Muslim and male; henceforth, Jews, Christians, and the enemies of Islam and the Muslims are to decide on affairs concerning the honor and person of the Muslims.

A few months later, on Ashura, Khomeini gave an angry speech attacking the Shah as a "wretched miserable man." Two days later, on June 5 (15 of Khordad), Khomeini was arrested. This sparked three days of rioting and left several hundred dead (however, this number was inflated in the speeches and writings of Khomeini, in which he claims the army "slaughtered no less than 15,000").

== Aftermath ==
=== Immediate consequences ===
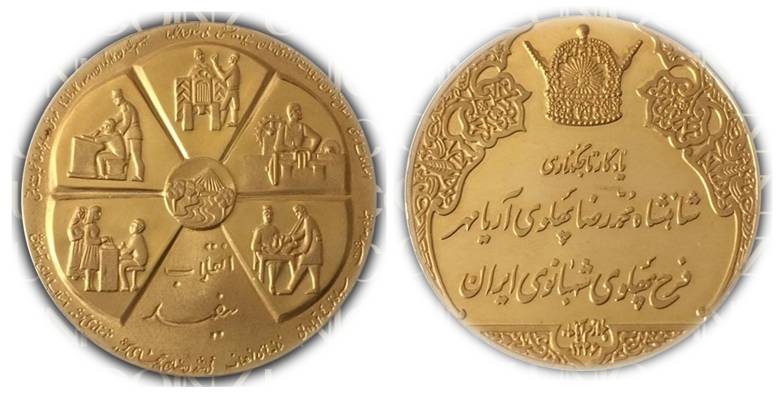
Coin on the anniversary of revolution

The most important and relevant consequence of the White Revolution and the reforms it brought was the increased popularity of Ruhollah Khomeini. With the growing perception of government corruption, and the implementation of reforms through the White Revolution, Khomeini grew to be an outspoken political enemy of the Shah. The White Revolution was the catalyst for Khomeini's change in thought. Once Khomeini, as a respected member of the clergy, started to openly oppose the Shah and call for his overthrow, a favourable view of him emerged amongst the opposition to the reforms, seeing him as a figure they could rally for.

=== Long-term consequences ===
NARA Newsreel about unrest in Iran following the White Revolution, 1963.

Though the White Revolution contributed towards the economic and technological advancement of Iran, the failures of some of the land reform programs and the partial lack of democratic reforms, as well as severe antagonism towards the White Revolution from the clergy and landed elites, would ultimately contribute to the Shah's eventual downfall and the Iranian Revolution in 1979, radically transforming Iran into the first ever Islamic theocracy in the world.

== See also ==
- Hasan Arsanjani
- 1963 Iranian referendum
- Great Civilization

== Bibliography ==
- Mackey, Sandra (1996), The Iranians: Persia, Islam and the Soul of a Nation, Dutton
- Amanat, Dominic P. (2008). "The Historical Roots of the Persecution of the Babis and Baha'is in Iran". In Brookshaw; Fazel, Seena B. (eds.). The Baha'is of Iran: Socio-historical studies. New York, NY: Routledge. ISBN 978-0-203-00280-3.
- Momen, Moojan (2004), "Conspiracies and Forgeries: the attack upon the Baha'i community in Iran", Persian Heritage, 9 (35): 27–29
- Sanasarian, Eliz (2000), Religious Minorities in Iran, Cambridge: Cambridge University Press, ISBN 0-521-77073-4
- Chehabi, H.E. (2008). "Anatomy of Prejudice". In Brookshaw, Dominic P.; Fazel, Seena B. (eds.). The Baha'is of Iran: Socio-historical studies. New York, NY: Routledge. ISBN 978-0-203-00280-3.
