= Iranian Land Reform =

Land Reform

Iranian Land Reform was a major land reform in Iran and one of the main concerns of the White Revolution of 1963. It was a significant part of the reform program of Shah Mohammad Reza Pahlavi and occurred when the existing feudal system was abolished and the arable land redistributed from large landowners to smaller agricultural workers.

== History ==
=== Preconditions ===
Reforms to improve the economic situation of the Iranian population had to be started in the agricultural sector. A main element of this was the implementation of a land reform programs designed to change the ownership structure of agricultural land. The first step in land reform started in the early 1950s. The Shah gave over 500,000 hectares of land to about 30,000 homeless families. Before the land reform, 70% of the arable land was owned by a small elite of large landowners or religious foundations. There was no official land register yet rather the land ownership was documented by means of title deeds whereby the document did not represent a specific measured area of land but a village and the land belonging to the village. Before the land reform 50% of Iranian agricultural land was in the hands of large landowners, 20% belonged to charitable or religious foundations, 10% was owned by the state or owned by the crown and only 20% belonged to free farmers. Before the land reform began 18,000 villages had been recorded of which the land would be divided among the farmers living in the village.

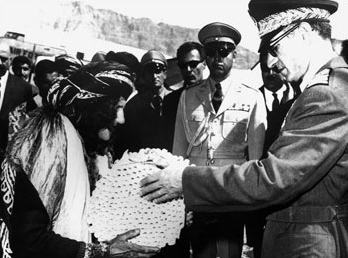
The Shah distributed land titles as part of the White Revolution

=== First Attempts ===
Shah Mohammad Reza Pahlavi had spoken of the need for land reform for many years but the clergy resistance had repeatedly led him to postpone the reform. At the end of the reign of Prime Minister Manouchehr Eghbal the then Minister of Agriculture, Jamshid Amusegar, submitted a bill on land reform to the parliament. It was, however, diluted by the representatives of the big landowners in Parliament. Despite this the measure was adopted on the 6 June 1960 and was the first attempt at land reform. It though did not lead to a fundamental redistribution of land ownership in Iran. On 11 November 11, 1961 the Shah commissioned Prime Minister Ali Amini to develop proposals for the implementation of the planned land reform program. On 14 November 14, 1961 Amini declared that the Shah had given him special powers to implement the reform program. National Front MPs massively criticized Amini so Amini ultimately arrested the leaders of the reform critics. In January 1962, he assigned his Minister of Agriculture Hassan Arsanjanito to revise the 1960 Land Reform Act. From now on the large landowners were only allowed to own one village. They had to sell the rest of their land to the state which in turn was to sell it to the landless farmers at a significantly lower price. The state also granted farmers cheap loans when they formed agricultural cooperatives.

=== White Revolution ===
Mohammad Reza Shah wanted to promote Iranian economic and social reform in a coordinated reform project which became the White Revolution. After Amini's resignation, the cabinet of Prime Minister Asadollah Alam was commissioned to legislate the reforms. In January 1963 the Minister of Agriculture, Arsanjani, drafted an amendment to the Land Reform Law which was intended to put an end to the Iranian feudal system which still existed during the Qajar period. Critics of land reform from the ranks of large landowners accused Arsanjani that the reform law would violate the constitution, the laws of Islam, and the country's existing laws. It became clear that the White Revolution program, and especially land reform, against the resistance of the large landowners and the clergy could only be implemented if it were supported by the vast majority of the Iranian population. For this reason the Shah planned a referendum in which Iranian citizens should vote on whether they would approve or reject the reform plans. Although Ruhollah Khomeini branded the referendum an anti-God project and called on all believers not to vote, 5,598,711 Iranians voted in favor and only 4,115 opposed. Grand Ayatollah Hossein Borujerdi also spoken out against the reform program, but his death in March 1961 invalidated the anti-White Revolution fatwa.

Mohammad Reza Shah said before the referendum:

“If I have decided to refer these reforms to a referendum, it is because I want to prevent our peasants from becoming serfs again, that our country's natural resources benefit a few people and that these revolutionary changes no longer matter can be impaired or destroyed at the instigation of a minority."

== See also ==
- Land reforms by country
