= 1953 Iranian parliamentary dissolution referendum =

- 3–10 August 1953
- Dissolution or Continuation of the 17th National Consultative Assembly

Results
Choice	Votes	%
Yes	2,043,389	99.94%
No	1,207	0.06%
Valid votes	2,044,596	100.00%
Invalid or blank votes	4	0.00%
Total votes	2,044,600	100.00%

A referendum on the dissolution of Parliament, the first referendum ever held in Iran, was held in August 1953. The referendum was deemed by many to be contrary of the then Constitution of Iran, which reserved the power to dissolve parliament to the Shah. The vote was boycotted by the opposition, including influential figures like Ayatollah Kashani. The proposal of the referendum was passed by more than 99% of the votes, a result that was described as fraudulent by several observers, both based on the methods of execution of the referendum and given the very high percentage of yes votes.

Following the referendum, there were talks about another referendum to abolish the Pahlavi dynasty and make Iran a republic; however, the government was overthrown by a coup d'état shortly after.

== Timeline ==
- 12 July: PM Mohammad Mosaddegh openly announced his intention to hold the referendum, asking people to either choose between his government or the 17th Parliament.
- 14 July: The decision to hold the referendum was approved by the cabinet.
- 3 August: The referendum was held in Tehran.
- 10 August: The referendum was held in other cities.
- 13 August: The official results of the polls were declared by the interior ministry.
- 16 August: Mosaddegh officially announced the dissolution of the parliament.
- 19 August: The government was overthrown in a coup d'état.

== Campaign ==
Position	Organization	Ref
Yes	Iran Party	
Yes	Iranian People Party	
Yes	Tudeh Party	
Yes	Pan-Iranist Party	
Yes	Nation Party	
Yes	Third Force	
Boycott	Toilers Party	
Boycott	Muslim Warriors	

== Controversy ==
The balloting was not secret and there were two separate voting booths, i.e. the opponents of Mossadegh had to cast their vote in a separate tent. Voters were required to give name, address and the number and place of issuance of his identity card. Critics pointed that the referendum had ignored the democratic demand for secret ballots.

Officials at the voting booth in favor of the motion reportedly did not check identity cards or stamp voter's hands to indicate having submitted a ballot, leading to accusations of voter fraud. Voters at the booth against the motion were presented with intimidating signs such as “Only Traitors Vote for Non-Dissolution.”

Rural areas were also excluded from the ballot, under the argument it would take too long to count the votes from remote areas.

== Results ==
Choice	Votes	%
For	2,043,389	99.94
Against	1,207	0.06
Invalid/blank votes	4	–
Total	2,044,600	100
Source: Direct Democracy

=== By city ===
City	Yes	No
Tehran	101,396	67
Tabriz	41,502	3
Isfahan	43,505	11
Ahvaz	22,771	2
Mashhad	26,547	9

== Reactions ==
=== Domestic ===
- Ayatollah Kashani said taking part in such a referendum is haraam (religiously prohibited). However, Ayatollah Boroujerdi supported the referendum.
- Mohammad Reza Shah declared the results "fraudulent".

=== International ===
- United States: On 5 August 1953, the U.S. President Dwight Eisenhower, speaking to a gathering of state governors in Seattle, criticized Mosaddegh for the decision and specified that it had been supported by the communist party. An editorial published by The New York Times on 4 August characterized the exercise as "More fantastic and farcical than any ever held under Hitler or Stalin", and an effort by Mosaddegh "to make himself unchallenged dictator of the country".
