= Mard-i Imruz =

Iranian weekly newspaper (1942–1948)

- Type: Weekly newspaper
- Owner: Mohammad Masud
- Founded: 20 August 1942
- Ceased publication: 14 February 1948
- Language: Persian
- Headquarters: Tehran
- Country: Iran

Mard-i Imruz (Persian: مرد امروز, lit. 'The Man of Today') was a Persian language weekly newspaper which was in circulation between 1942 and 1948. It was based in Tehran, Iran. The paper was among the opposition publications of the period.

== History and profile ==
Mard-i Imruz was established by Mohammad Masud, who held the newspaper's licence. Its first issue appeared on 20 August 1942. The paper was based in Tehran. It was frequently banned because of its critical stance toward the Iranian government and because of accusations that it engaged in blackmail against wealthy individuals. One of its contributors was Hossein Fatemi, who later became foreign minister. The newspaper also made regular use of political cartoons to express opposition to the authorities.

In 1943, Mard-i Imruz became the official organ of the Paikar Party and was involved in the formation of the Independent Front in 1944. Its license was revoked in October 1945 and restored in April 1946. After that, the paper stopped its attacks on the authorities for a period, until March 1947, when its sharp criticism resumed. Masud was then arrested, and Mard-i Imruz was suspended for two weeks.

In October 1947, Masud publicly argued in the newspaper that Prime Minister Ahmad Qavam should be killed because of the oil concession agreement with the Soviet Union. Mard-i Imruz ceased publication on 14 February 1948, the day after Mohammad Masud was assassinated.

== Legacy ==
Hossein Fatemi launched his daily newspaper, Bakhtar-e Emruz, to succeed Mard-i Imruz.
