= Great Civilization =

Vision of Mohammad Reza Pahlavi for Iran

The Great Civilization (Persian: تمدن بزرگ, romanized: tamadon-e bozorg) is a term describing the Shah of Iran's political ambitions for Iran with near perfect communal conditions such as no poverty, ignorance, illiteracy, corruption, exploitation, or discrimination.

== Plan ==
The Shah envisioned public health services bringing "for each Iranian maximum health and stamina," education yielding "the greatest possible degree of mental and intellectual well being," social insurance "from birth to death," and wages which would permit for all an individual's basic needs. All Iranians would be guaranteed housing and free from hunger as part of the Great Civilization. The Shah predicted the Great Civilization was not in the far future as Iran would reach the level of progress Western Europe had in 1978 by 1990 and Iran would catch up to nations like France and the United Kingdom by the end of the century. The Shah had prophesied the Great Civilization was destined as Iranians had a natural invincible energy, humanity, a sense of justice and rights, gift for sciences, literature, arts, universal outlook, and a deep-seated patriotism that protects Iranianness in any adversity. The Shah sought to prove Iran's Great Civilization would surpass western nations and avoid the shortcoming of the west. He told westerners Iran would be "free from the blemishes of your [Western] society" and in a 1974 Indian newspaper, the Shah stated, "If we [Eastern nations] protect [our] inheritance … I am confident that we shall avoid the abysses into which material and materialistic civilisations have fallen."

== Interview statement ==
During an interview on the American political news program Meet the Press, interviewer Lawrence E. Spivak asked the Shah, "Your Majesty, in an interview last year you were reported as saying in 25 years Iran will be the fifth largest world power and that your achievements will be what you can contribute to civilisation. What is it you would like to contribute to civilisation?" The Shah responded:

[T]he wages and the revenues of every individual will be enough to cover their expenses. Many of their expenses will be sustained or subsidised by the states. Studies will be free until the end of the university level and more if necessary. [We] will provide even food for the children during their school hours. Every kind of insurances will take care of everything that could happen to them during their lives. So they will, since the moment that they will be born until they die, they will be covered by various kind[s] of insurances or measures taken by the government or their society to provide them[…]”

== See also ==
- White Revolution
