= Ministry of Culture (Iran) =

Government ministry in Iran

Ministry of Culture Iran (Persian:وزیر فرهنگ) was a government ministry in Iran, established in 1945 after separating from the Ministry of Education, Endowments, and Fine Arts. In December 1964, the ministry was split into two independent institutions: the Ministry of Culture and Arts and the Ministry of Education. The term "Education" (Āmozesh va Parvaresh) was first proposed by Mohammad Jahanshahi during the 1960s.

== Ministers of Education (Pahlavi era) ==
After the establishment of the Ministry of Education in December 1964, the following ministers served until the 1979 Iranian Revolution:

No.	Minister	Term start	Term end	Prime Minister
1	Hadi Hedayati	6 December 1964	28 August 1968	Amir-Abbas Hoveyda
2	Farrokhroo Parsa	28 August 1968	27 April 1973	Amir-Abbas Hoveyda
3	Ahmad Houshang Sharifi	27 April 1973	4 November 1976	Amir-Abbas Hoveyda
4	Manouchehr Ganji	4 November 1976	5 November 1978	Jamshid Amouzegar / Jafar Sharif-Emami
–	Kamal Habibollahi (acting)	6 November 1978	November 1978	Gholam Reza Azhari
5	Mohammad Reza Ameli Tehrani	November 1978	6 January 1979	Gholam Reza Azhari / Shapour Bakhtiar
6	Mohammad-Amin Riahi	6 January 1979	11 February 1979	Shapour Bakhtiar

== Notable Minister ==
Farrokhroo Parsa was the first female cabinet minister in Iran and one of the most prominent Ministers of Education during the Pahlavi era. She served from August 1968 to April 1973, playing a symbolic role in Iranian politics. After the Iranian Revolution, she was arrested and executed.
