= Mohammad Masud =

Iranian journalist (1902–1948)

- محمد مسعود
- Born: Mohammad Masud Qummi; 1905
- Died: 13 February 1948 (aged 42–43)
- Occupation: Journalist
- Years active: 1930s–1948
- Known for: Founder of Mard-i Imruz

Mohammad Masud (Persian: محمد مسعود; 1905–1948) was an Iranian journalist and writer. He published some books and launched a weekly newspaper, Mard-i Imruz (lit. The Man of Today). He was an ardent critic of Pahlavi rule and Prime Minister Ahmad Qavam. Masud was assassinated in February 1948.

== Biography ==
Masud was born in 1905. He went to Belgium to study journalism in 1935 when he was awarded a government scholarship and returned to Iran in 1938 following his graduation. He applied for a state institution for employment, but his application was denied. After this incident he became a critic of Reza Shah.

In 1942, Masud published an autobiography entitled Guha'i keh dar Jahannam Miruyand (Persian: Flowers which Grow in Hell). Next year, he published another book, Bahar-i Umr (Persian: The Spring of Life). In 1942, he also started his journalism career launching a weekly newspaper entitled Mard-i Imruz in which he published critical articles and political cartoons which targeted Prime Minister Ahmad Qavam and his cabinet. Journalist and future foreign minister Hossein Fatemi was one of Masud's close friends who contributed to Mard-i Imruz. In October 1947, Masud publicly argued in the paper that Qavam should be murdered due to the oil concession treaty with the Soviet Union. Homa Katouzian argues that Masud employed his paper to get money from the rich whom he attacked through sensational news about them.

Four months later on 13 February 1948, Masud was assassinated by a squad led by Noureddin Kianouri. The group was linked to the Tudeh Party. His assassination was the first of the political killings which continued into the 1950s in Iran.

Hossein Fatemi was delivering a speech in a ceremony for Masud at his grave on 13 February 1952 when he became a target of the assassination attempt by a member of the Fedayan-e Islam. Although he survived this attack, he was severely injured.
