= Bagher Kazemi =

Iranian politician (1892–1976)

Seyyed Bagher Kazemi
- باقر کاظمی
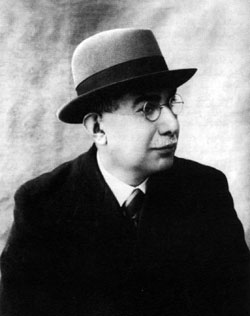
- Bagher Kazemi

Minister of Roads and Urban Development of Iran
- In office 9 May 1930 – March 1932
- Monarch: Reza Shah Pahlavi
- Prime Minister: Mehdi Qoli Hedayat
- Preceded by: Hassan Taqizadeh
- Succeeded by: Reza Afshar

Minister of Economic Affairs and Finance of Iran
- In office June 1952 – July 1953
- Monarch: Mohammad Reza Pahlavi
- Prime Minister: Mohammad Mosaddegh
- Preceded by: Muhammed Ali Warestah
- Succeeded by: Ali Mubasher

Personal details
- Born: 10 February 1892 Tafresh, Sublime State of Iran
- Died: 10 November 1977 (aged 85) Tehran, Imperial State of Iran
- Spouse: Ain El Mulok Salor
- Children: 2

Bagher Khan Muhazab Al Dawleh Kazemi also known as Bagher Kazemi (Persian: باقر کاظمی; 10 February 1892 – 10 November 1977), was an Iranian politician, diplomat and minister. He served as Iran's ambassador to several countries, including France, Turkey and Afghanistan and Governor of East Azerbaijan Province from March 1932 to August 1933.

Following the overthrow of Mohammad Mosaddegh Kazemi and four other political figures close to him, including Shamseddin Amir Alaei, were arrested on the orders of Teymur Bakhtiar, military governor of Tehran, in May 1955.
