= Iranian Science Corps =

The symbol of Science Corps

Science Corps, also known as Literacy Corps was one of the three corps in Iran managed by the Ministry of Education and Ministry of War before the 1979 revolution. They were a public education program, part of principle number 6 of the White Revolution. The Corps trained around 100,000 Iranian students and adults. People hired by the Corps were first trained by the Imperial Iranian Army for 4 months and then employed as teachers and educators by the Education Ministry. They were then deployed to public schools and villages to serve for a period instead of conscription.

The Literacy Corps helped raise the nation's literacy rate from 26 to 42 percent.

Before the 1979 revolution, Ruhollah Khomeini was a vocal critic of the Science Corps, questioning their works and saying they secretly brought influences of American culture.

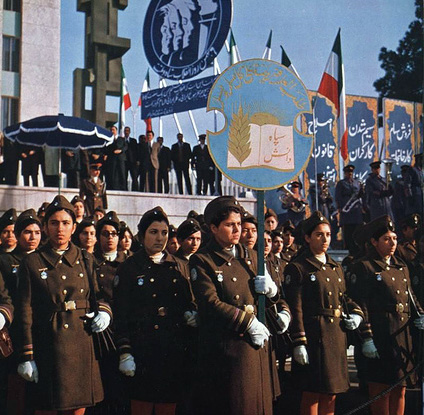
The parade of the Science Corps girls in front of the Senate Palace
