= 17th Iranian Majlis =

Legislative assembly starting 1952

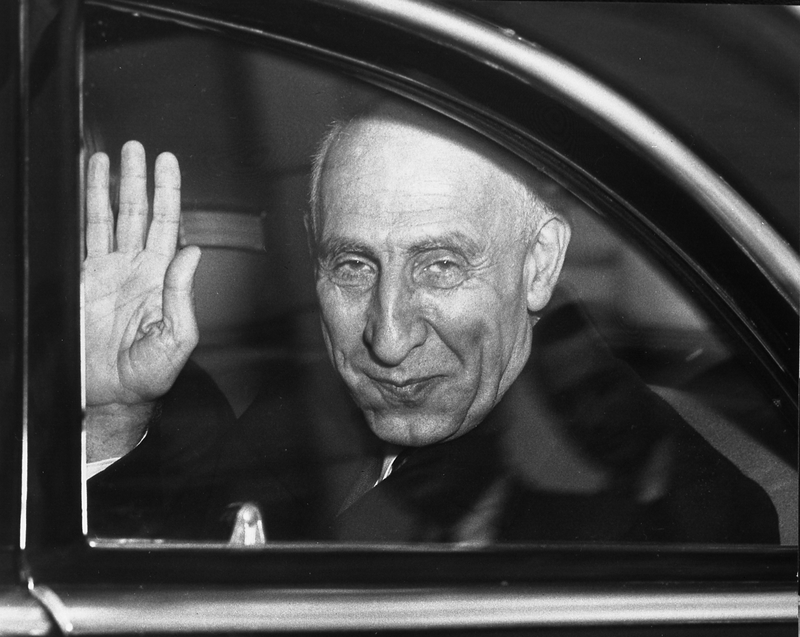
Prime Minister Mohammad Mosaddegh

The 17th Iranian Majlis was a legislative assembly with a term beginning on April 25, 1952.

Prime Minister Mohammad Mosaddegh was removed from power in a coup on 19 August 1953, organised and carried out by the CIA at the request of the British MI6 which chose Iranian General Fazlollah Zahedi to succeed Mosaddegh.

The 17th Majlis was ultimately dissolved by Mohammad Reza Shah.

== See also ==
- 1953 Iran coup
