= Iranian architecture =

Architectural styles associated with Iran and nearby regions

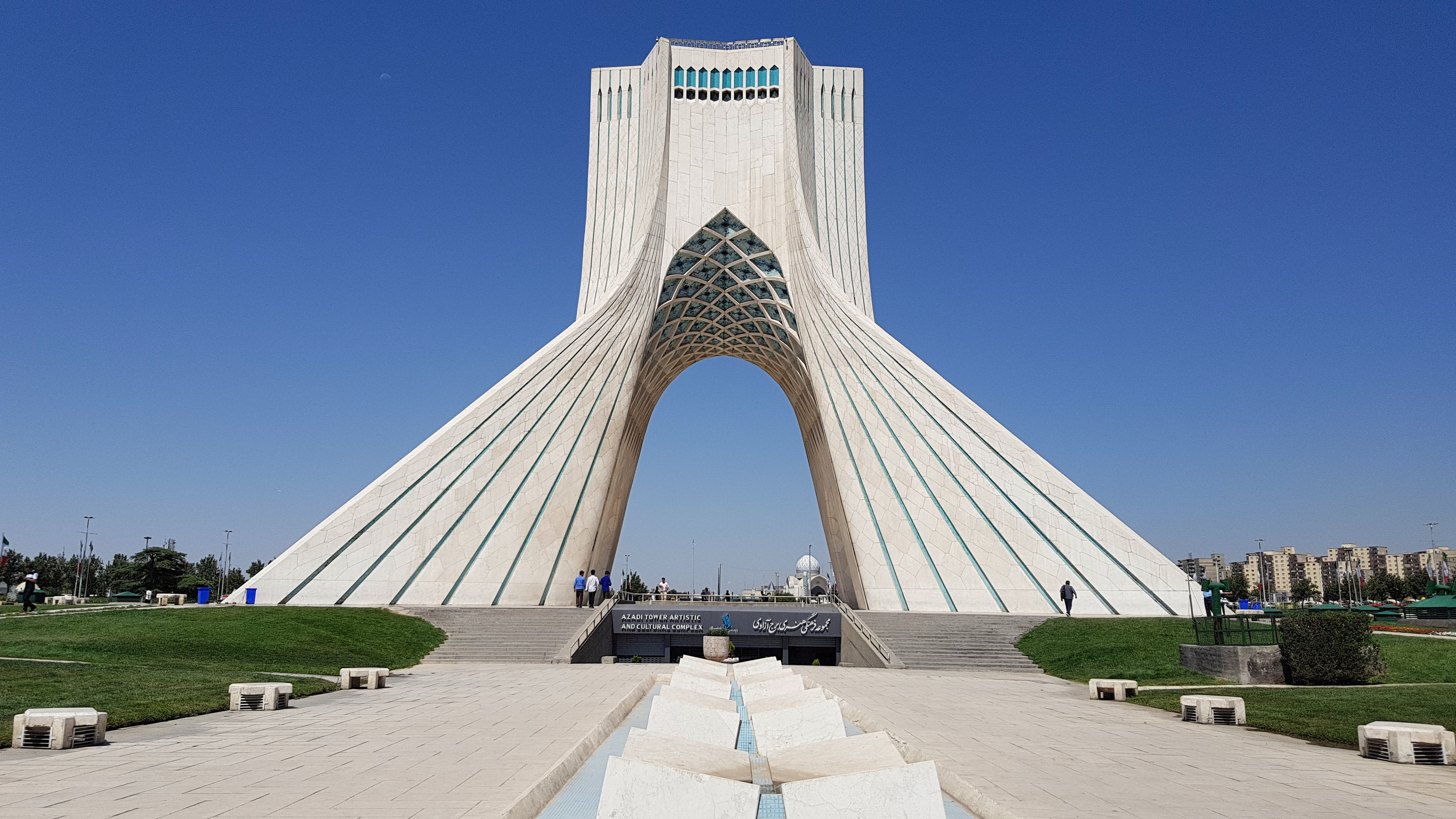
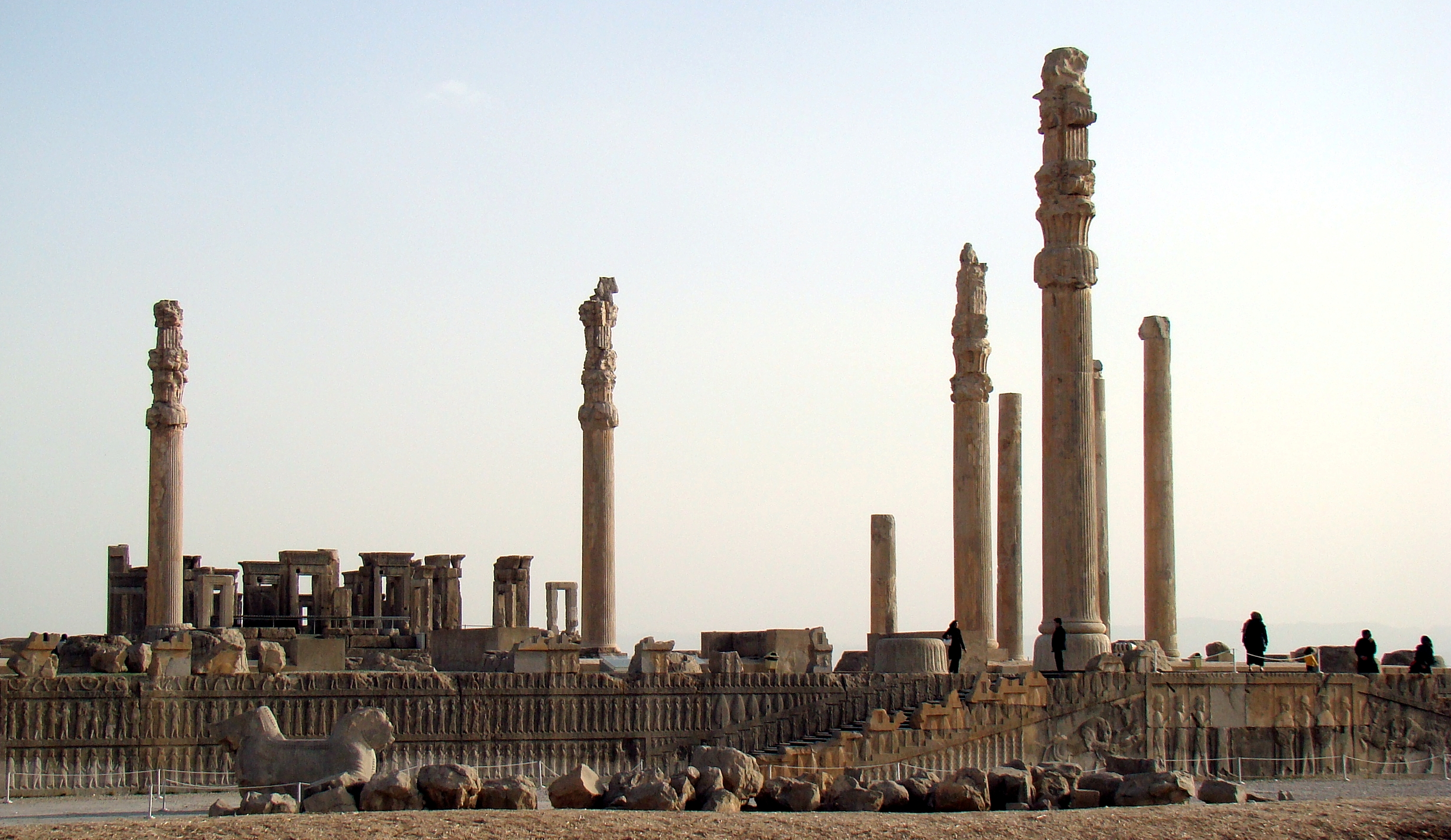
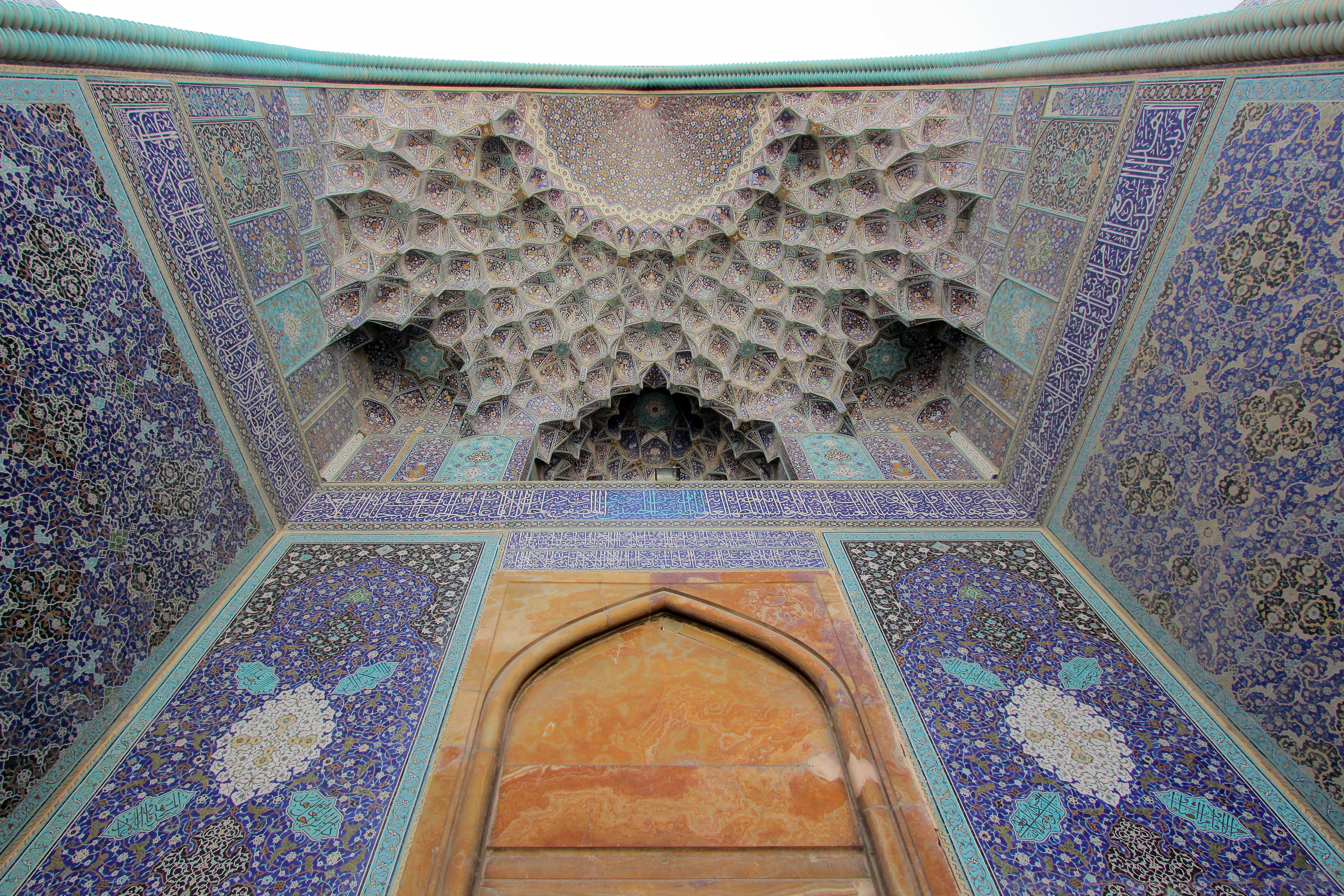
- Top: Azadi Tower in Tehran (1971), designed by architect Hossein Amanat, inspired by historical Iranian architecture; Middle: The ruins of Persepolis, begun in the 6th century BC during the Achaemenid Empire; Bottom: Iwan with muqarnas decoration at the Shah Mosque in Isfahan (17th century)
- Location: Iran, Central Asia, Iraq and nearby regions

Iranian architecture or Persian architecture is the architecture of Iran and parts of the rest of West Asia, the Caucasus and Central Asia. Its history dates back to at least 5000 BC with characteristic examples distributed over a vast area from Turkey and Iraq to Uzbekistan and Tajikistan. Iranian buildings vary greatly in scale and function, from vernacular architecture to monumental complexes. In addition to historic gates, palaces, and mosques, the rapid growth of cities such as the capital Tehran has brought about a wave of demolition and new construction.

According to American historian and archaeologist Arthur Pope, the supreme Iranian art, in the proper meaning of the word, has always been its architecture. The supremacy of architecture applies to both pre- and post-Islamic periods. Iranian architecture displays great variety, both structural and aesthetic, from a variety of traditions and experiences. Without sudden innovations, and despite the repeated trauma of invasions and cultural shocks, it developed a recognizable style distinct from other regions of the Muslim world. Its virtues are "a marked feeling for form and scale; structural inventiveness, especially in vault and dome construction; a genius for decoration with a freedom and success not rivaled in any other architecture".

== General characteristics ==
=== Fundamental principles ===
Traditional Iranian architecture has maintained a continuity that, although temporarily distracted by internal political conflicts or foreign invasion, nonetheless has achieved an unmistakable style.

Arthur Pope, a 20th-century scholar of Persian architecture, described it in these terms: "there are no trivial buildings; even garden pavilions have nobility and dignity, and the humblest caravanserais generally have charm. In expressiveness and communicativity, most Persian buildings are lucid, even eloquent. The combination of intensity and simplicity of form provides immediacy, while ornament and, often, subtle proportions reward sustained observation."

According to scholars Nader Ardalan and Laleh Bakhtiar, the guiding formative motif of Iranian architecture has been its cosmic symbolism "by which man is brought into communication and participation with the powers of heaven". This theme has not only given unity and continuity to the architecture of Iran, but has been a primary source of its emotional character as well.

=== Materials ===
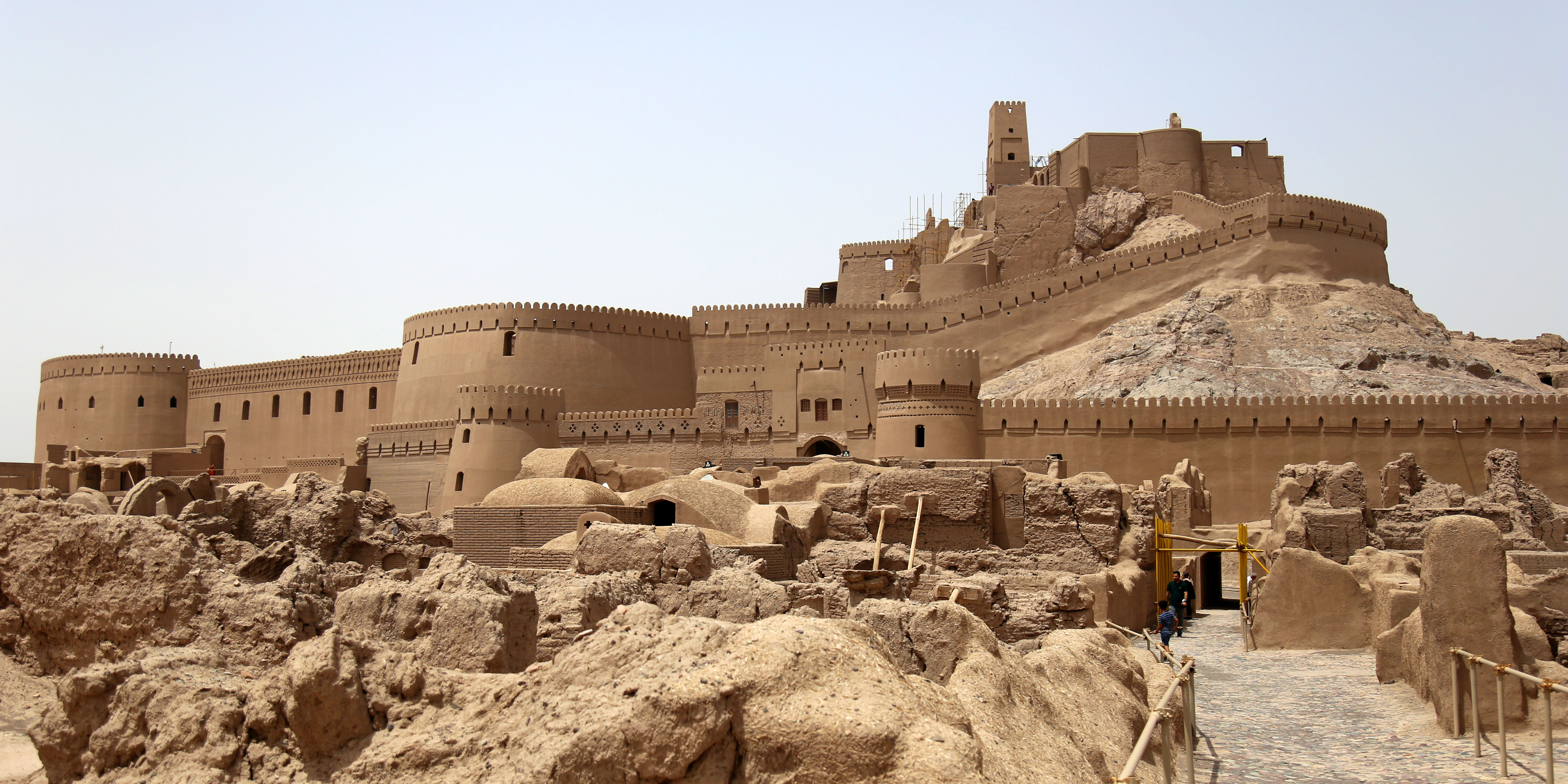
Arg-e Bam, a historic citadel and a major example of earthen architecture, built mainly from cob and adobe

Available building materials dictate major forms in traditional Iranian architecture. Heavy clays, readily available at various places throughout the plateau, have encouraged the development of the most primitive of all building techniques, molded mud, compressed as solidly as possible, and allowed to dry. This technique, used in Iran from ancient times, has never been completely abandoned. The abundance of heavy plastic earth, in conjunction with a tenacious lime mortar, also facilitated the development and use of brick.

=== Design ===
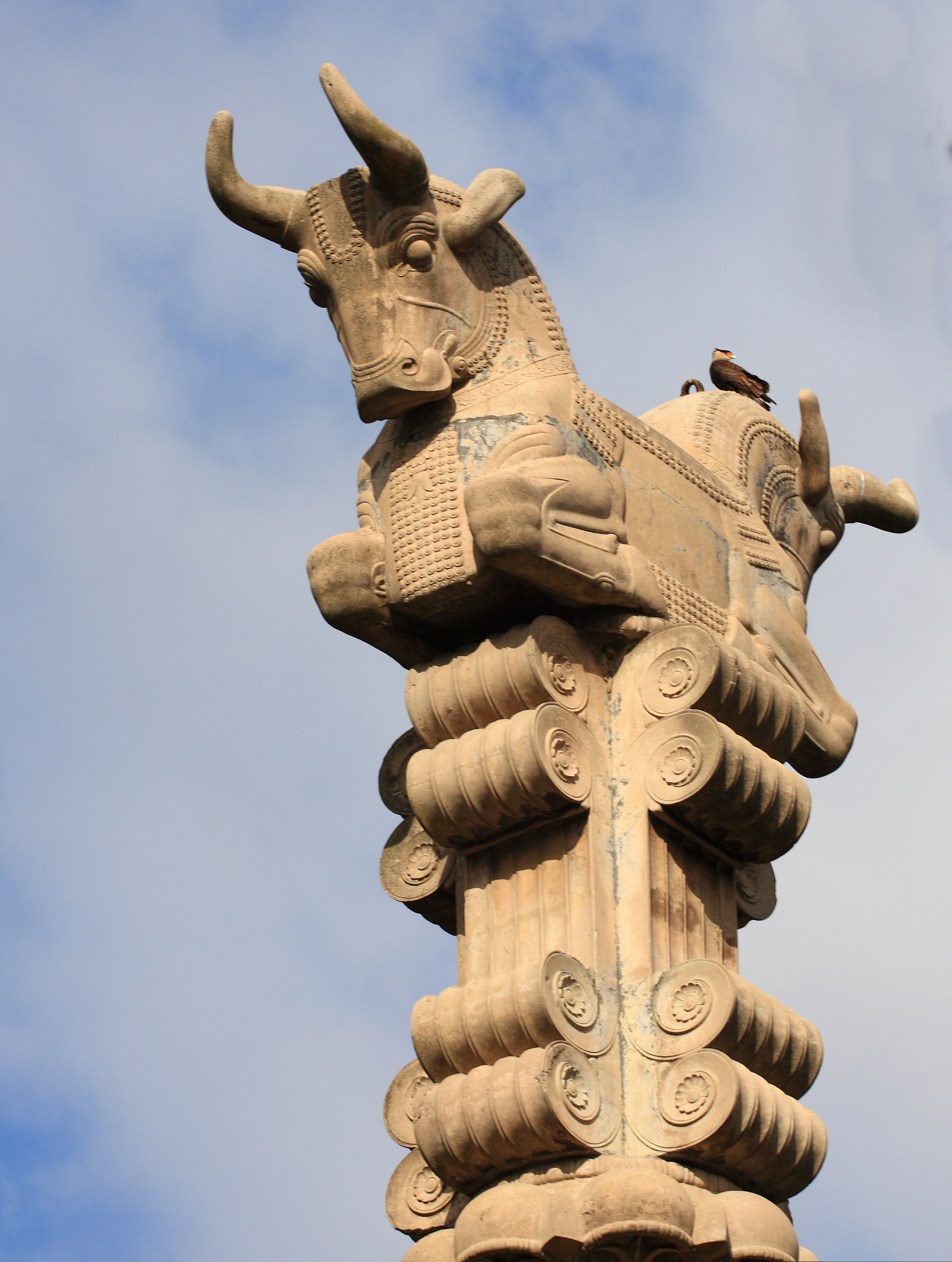
Persian-style column at ancient Persepolis, with capital sculpted in double-bull form

Certain design elements of Persian architecture have persisted throughout the history of Iran. The most striking are a marked feeling for scale and a discerning use of simple and massive forms. The consistency of decorative preferences, the high-arched portal set within a recess, columns with bracket capitals, and recurrent types of plan and elevation can also be mentioned. Through the ages these elements have recurred in completely different types of buildings, constructed for various programs and under the patronage of a long succession of rulers.

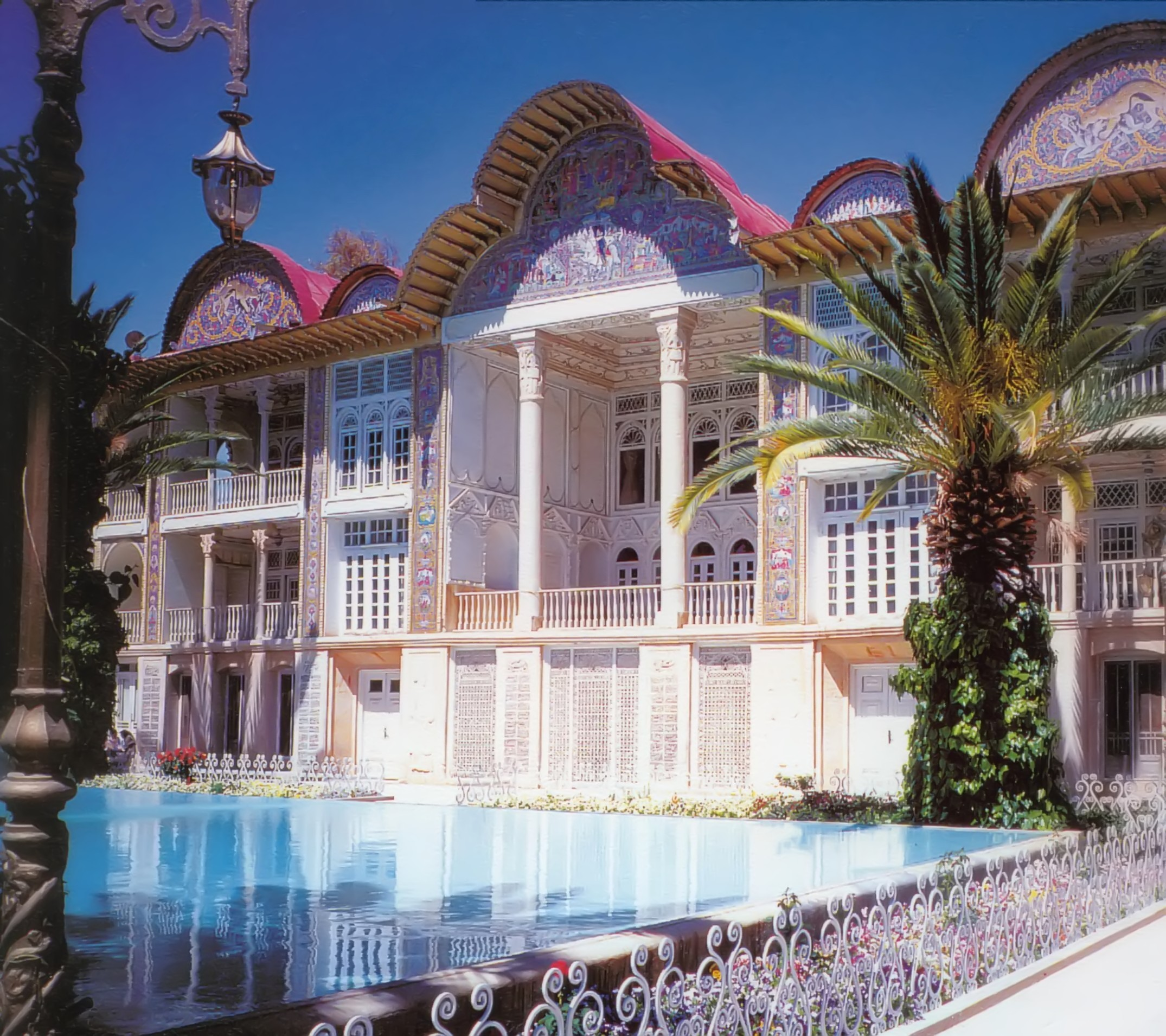
Eram Garden (19th century) in Shiraz, with example of a talar

The columned porch, or talar, seen in the rock-cut tombs near Persepolis, reappear in Sassanid temples, and in late Islamic times it was used as the portico of a palace or mosque, and adapted even to the architecture of roadside tea-houses. Similarly, the dome on four arches, so characteristic of Sassanid times, is a still to be found in many cemeteries and Imamzadehs across Iran today. The notion of earthly towers reaching up toward the sky to mingle with the divine towers of heaven lasted into the 19th century, while the interior court and pool, the angled entrance and extensive decoration are ancient, but still common, features of Iranian architecture.

=== City planning ===
A circular city plan was a characteristic of several major Parthian and Sasanian cities, such as Hatra and Gor (Firuzabad). Another city design was based on a square geometry, found in the Eastern Iranian cities such as Bam and Zaranj.

=== Categorization of styles ===
Overall, Mohammad Karim Pirnia categorizes the traditional architecture of the Iranian lands throughout the ages into the six following classes or styles ("sabk"):

- Zoroastrian:
  - The Parsian style (up until the third century BCE) including:
    - Pre-Parsian style (up until the eighth century BCE) e.g. Chogha Zanbil,
    - Median style (from the eighth to the sixth century BCE),
    - Achaemenid style (from the sixth to the fourth century BCE) manifesting in construction of spectacular cities used for governance and inhabitation (such as Persepolis, Susa, Ecbatana), temples made for worship and social gatherings (such as Zoroastrian temples), and mausoleums erected in honor of fallen kings (such as the Tomb of Cyrus the Great),
  - The Parthian style includes designs from the following eras:
    - Seleucid era e.g. Anahita Temple, Khorheh,
    - Parthian era e.g. Hatra, the royal compounds at Nisa,
    - Sasanian era e.g. Ghal'eh Dokhtar, Taq Kasra, Bishapur, Darband (Derbent).
- Islamic:
  - The Khorasani style (from the late 7th until the end of the 10th century CE), e.g. Jameh Mosque of Nain and Jameh Mosque of Isfahan,
  - The Razi style (from the 11th century to the Mongol invasion period) which includes the methods and devices of the following periods:
    - Samanid period, e.g. Samanid Mausoleum,
    - Ziyarid period, e.g. Gonbad-e Qabus,
    - Seljuk period, e.g. Kharraqan towers,
  - The Azari style (from the late 13th century to the appearance of the Safavid dynasty in the 16th century), e.g. Soltaniyeh, Arg of Tabriz, Jameh Mosque of Varamin, Goharshad Mosque, Bibi-Khanym Mosque in Samarkand, tomb of Abdas-Samad, Gur-e Amir, Jameh Mosque of Yazd
  - The Isfahani style spanning through the Safavid, Afsharid, Zand, and Qajar eras starting from the 16th century onward, e.g. Chehel Sotoun, Ali Qapu, Agha Bozorg Mosque, Shah Mosque, Sheikh Lotfollah Mosque in Naqsh-e Jahan Square.

== Pre-Islamic architecture ==
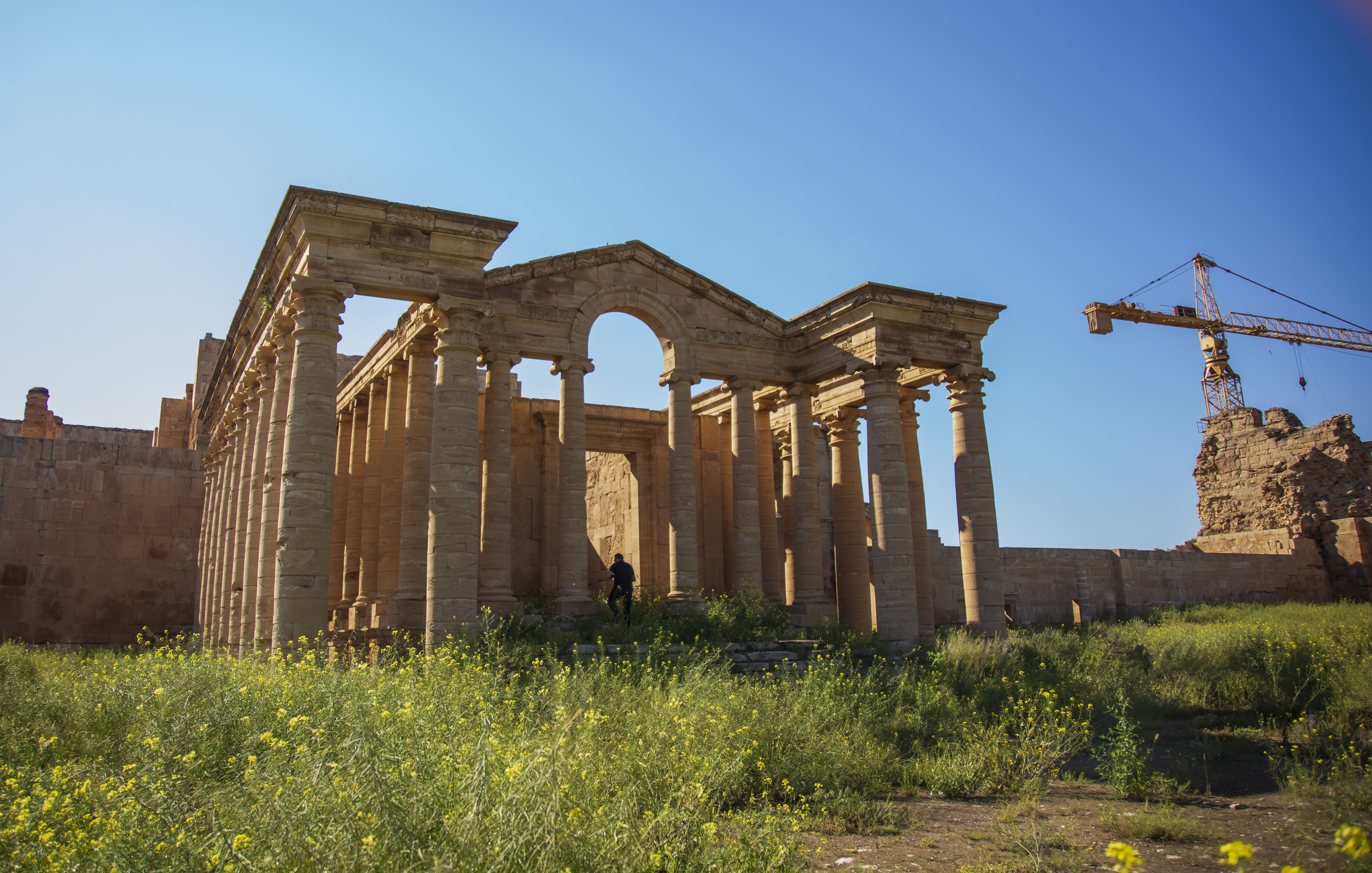
Hatra in Nineveh, Iraq

Hatra was a religious and trading center. Today it is a World Heritage Site, protected by UNESCO.

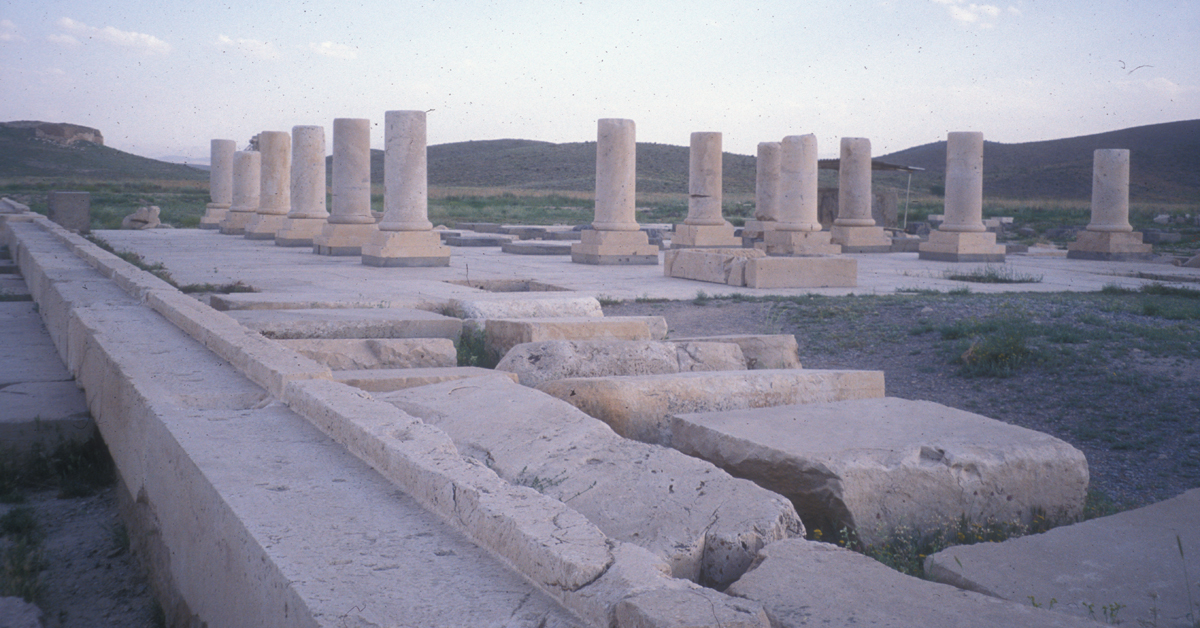
Pasargadae

The pre-Islamic styles draw on 3000 to 4000 years of architectural development from various civilizations of the Iranian plateau. The post-Islamic architecture of Iran, in turn, draws ideas from its pre-Islamic predecessor. It features geometrical and repetitive forms, as well as surfaces that are richly decorated with glazed tiles, carved stucco, patterned brickwork, floral motifs, and calligraphy.

Iran is recognized by UNESCO as being one of the cradles of civilization.

Each of the periods of Elamites, Achaemenids, Parthians and Sassanids were creators of great architecture that spread to other cultures. Although Iran has suffered its share of destruction, including Alexander the Great's decision to burn Persepolis, there are sufficient remains to form a picture of its classical architecture.

The Achaemenids built on a grand scale. The artists and materials were brought in from practically all territories of what was then the largest state in the world. Pasargadae set the standard: its city was laid out in an extensive park with bridges, gardens, colonnaded palaces and open column pavilions. Pasargadae along with Susa and Persepolis expressed the authority of 'The King of Kings', with the staircases of the latter recording in relief sculpture the vast extent of the imperial frontier.

With the emergence of the Parthians and Sassanids new forms appeared. Parthian innovations fully flowered during the Sassanid period with massive barrel-vaulted chambers, solid masonry domes and tall columns. This influence was to remain for years to come.

For example, the roundness of the city of Baghdad in the Abbasid era, points to its Persian precedents, such as Firouzabad in Fars. Al-Mansur hired two designers to plan the city's design: Naubakht, a former Persian Zoroastrian who also determined that the date of the foundation of the city should be astrologically significant, and Mashallah ibn Athari, a former Jew from Khorasan.

Persian contributions to the art of building can be seen at the ruins of Persepolis, Ctesiphon, Tepe Sialk, Pasargadae, Firouzabad, and Arg-e Bam. The Sassanid castle at Derbent, Dagestan (now part of Russia), is an example of Sassanid Iranian architecture. It has been a UNESCO World Heritage Site since 2003.

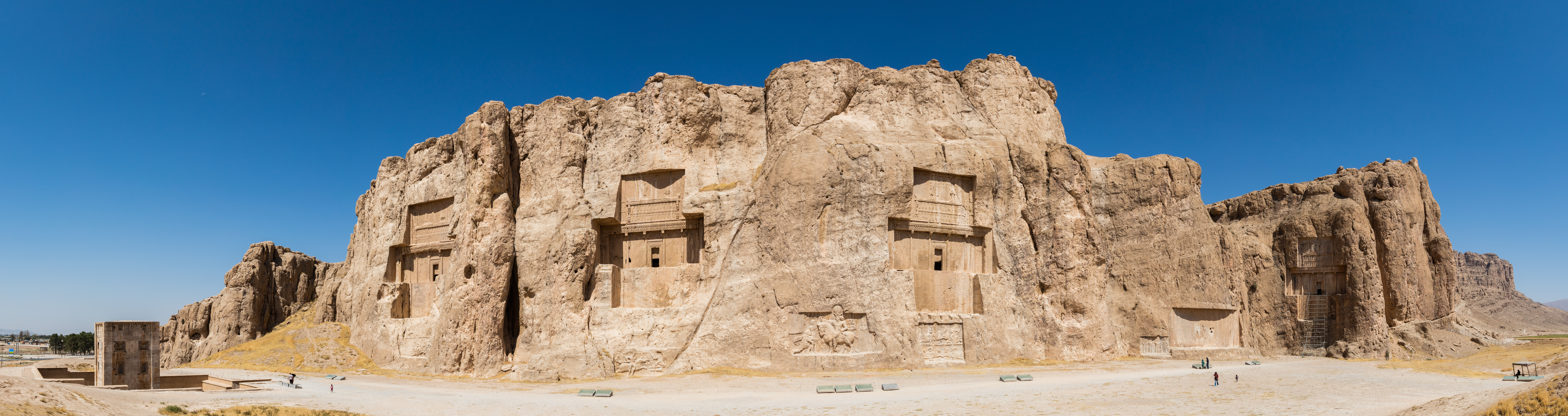
Panoramic view of the Naqsh-e Rostam. This site contains the tombs of four Achaemenid kings, including those of Darius the Great and Xerxes I.

=== Sub-periods ===
According to Mohammad Karim Pirnia, the ancient architecture of Iran can be divided into the following periods.

==== Pre-Parsian style ====
The pre-Parsian style (New Persian:شیوه معماری پیش از پارسی) is a sub-style of architecture (or "zeer-sabk") when categorizing the history of Persian/Iranian architectural development. This architectural style flourished in the Iranian Plateau until the eighth century BC, during the era of the Median Empire. It is often classified as a subcategory of Parsian architecture. The oldest remains of the architectural landmarks in this style are the Teppe Zagheh, near Qazvin. Other extant examples of this style are Chogha Zanbil, Tepe Sialk, Shahr-e Sukhteh, and Ecbatana. Elamite and proto-Elamite buildings among others, are covered within this stylistic subcategory as well.

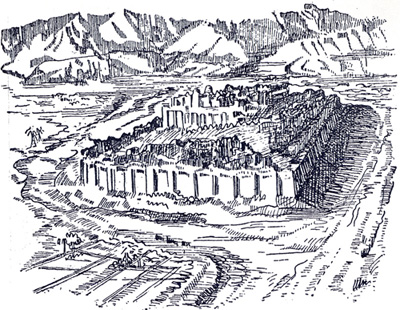
Sialk necropolis. 3000–4000 BC

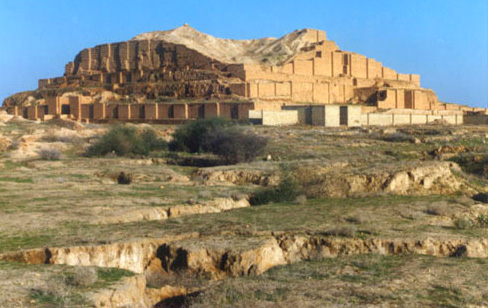
Chogha Zanbil ziggurat. 1250 BC

==== Parsian style ====
The "Persian style" (New Persian:شیوه معماری پارسی) is a style of architecture ("sabk") defined by Mohammad Karim Pirnia when categorizing the history of Persian/Iranian architectural development. Although Median and Achaemenid architecture fall under this classification, pre Achaemenid architecture is also considered a sub category. This style of architecture flourished from eighth century BCE from the time of the Median Empire, through the Achaemenid empire, to the arrival of Alexander the Great in the third century BCE

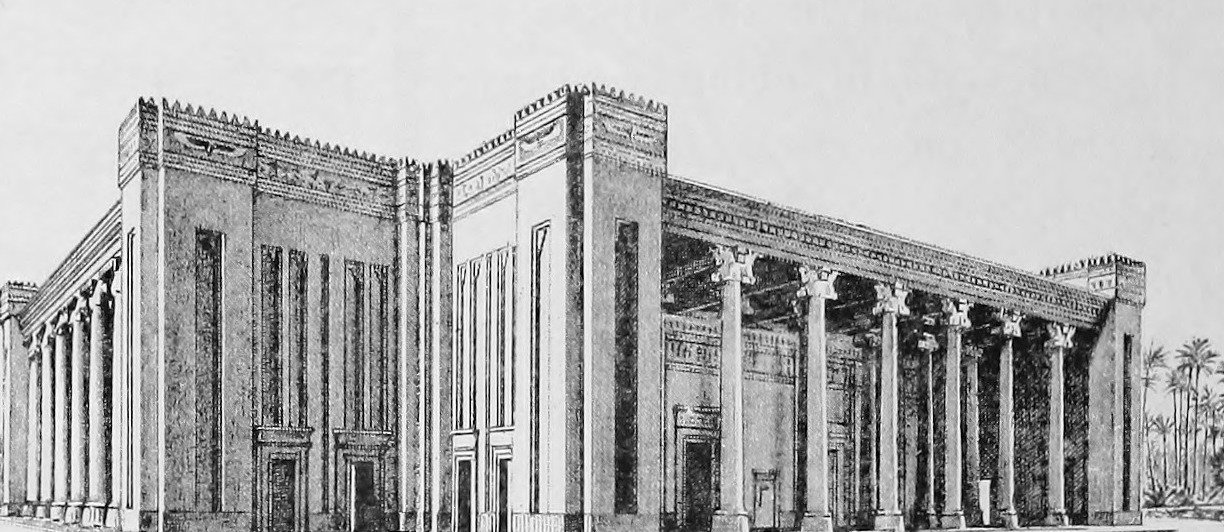
Palace of Darius in Susa

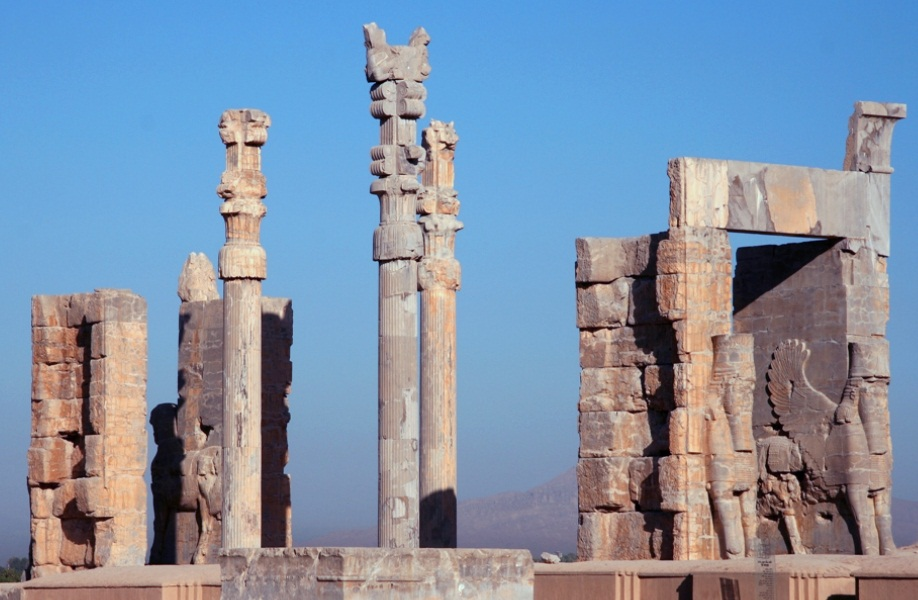
Persepolis

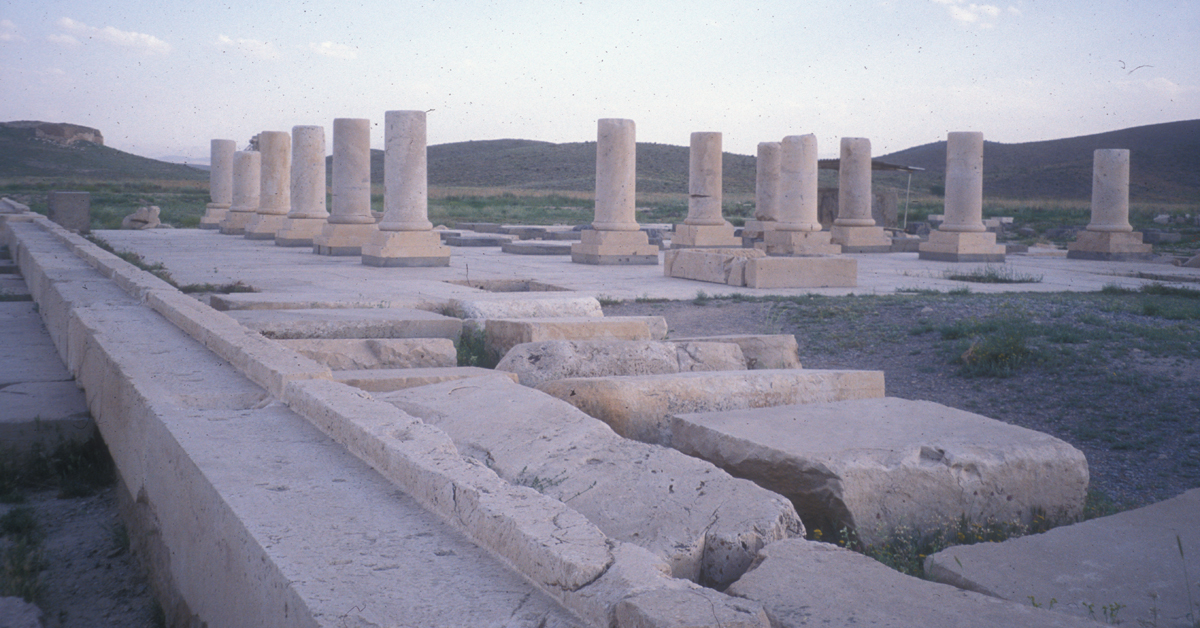
Pasargad

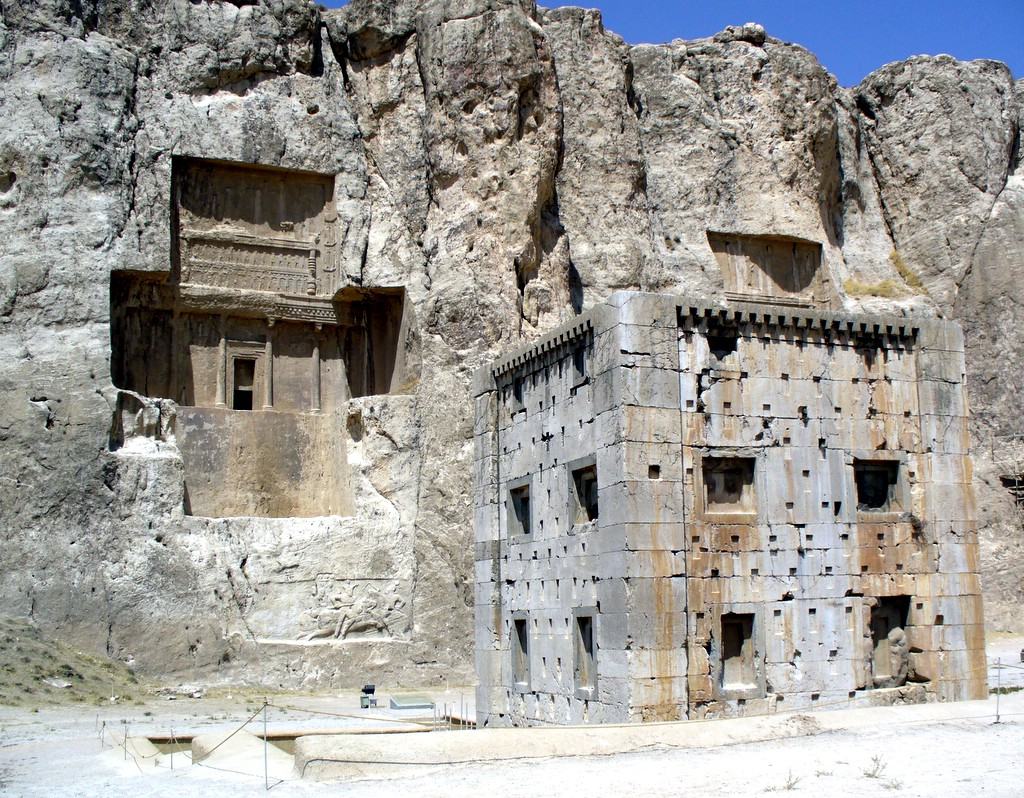
Naqsh-e Rostam

==== Parthian style ====
This architectural style includes designs from the Seleucid (310–140 BCE), Parthian (247 BCE – 224 CE), and Sassanid (224–651 CE) eras, reaching its apex of development in the Sassanid period. Examples of this style are Qal'eh Dokhtar, the royal compounds at Nisa, Anahita Temple, Khorheh, Hatra, the Taq Kasra, Bishapur, and the Palace of Ardashir in Ardeshir Khwarreh (Firuzabad).

== Islamic architecture ==
=== Early Islamic period (7th–9th centuries) ===
The Islamic era began with the formation of Islam under the leadership of Muhammad in early 7th-century Arabia. The Arab-Muslim conquest of Persia began soon afterwards and ended with the region coming under the control of the Rashidun Caliphs, followed by the Umayyad Caliphs after 661. Early Islamic architecture was heavily influenced by Byzantine architecture and Sasanian architecture. Umayyad architecture (661–750) drew on elements of these traditions, mixing them together and adapting them to the requirements of the new Muslim patrons.

After the overthrow of the Umayyads in 750 and their replacement by the Abbasid Caliphate, the caliphate's political center shifted further east to the new capital of Baghdad, in present-day Iraq. Partly as a result of this, Abbasid architecture was even more influenced by Sasanian architecture and by its roots in ancient Mesopotamia. During the 8th and 9th centuries, the power and unity of the Abbasid Caliphate allowed architectural features and innovations from its heartlands to spread quickly to other areas of the Islamic world under its influence, including Iran.

Features from the Umayyad period, such as vaulting, carved stucco, and painted wall decoration, were continued and elaborated in the Abbasid period. The four-centred arch, a more sophisticated form of the pointed arch, is first attested during the 9th century in Abbasid monuments at Samarra in Iraq, such as the Qasr al-Ashiq palace. It became widely used in later Iranian architecture. Samarra also saw the appearance of new decorative styles, which rendered the earlier vegetal motifs of Sasanian and Byzantine traditions into more abstract and stylized forms, as exemplified by the so-called "beveled" style. This style subsequently spread to other regions, including Iran.

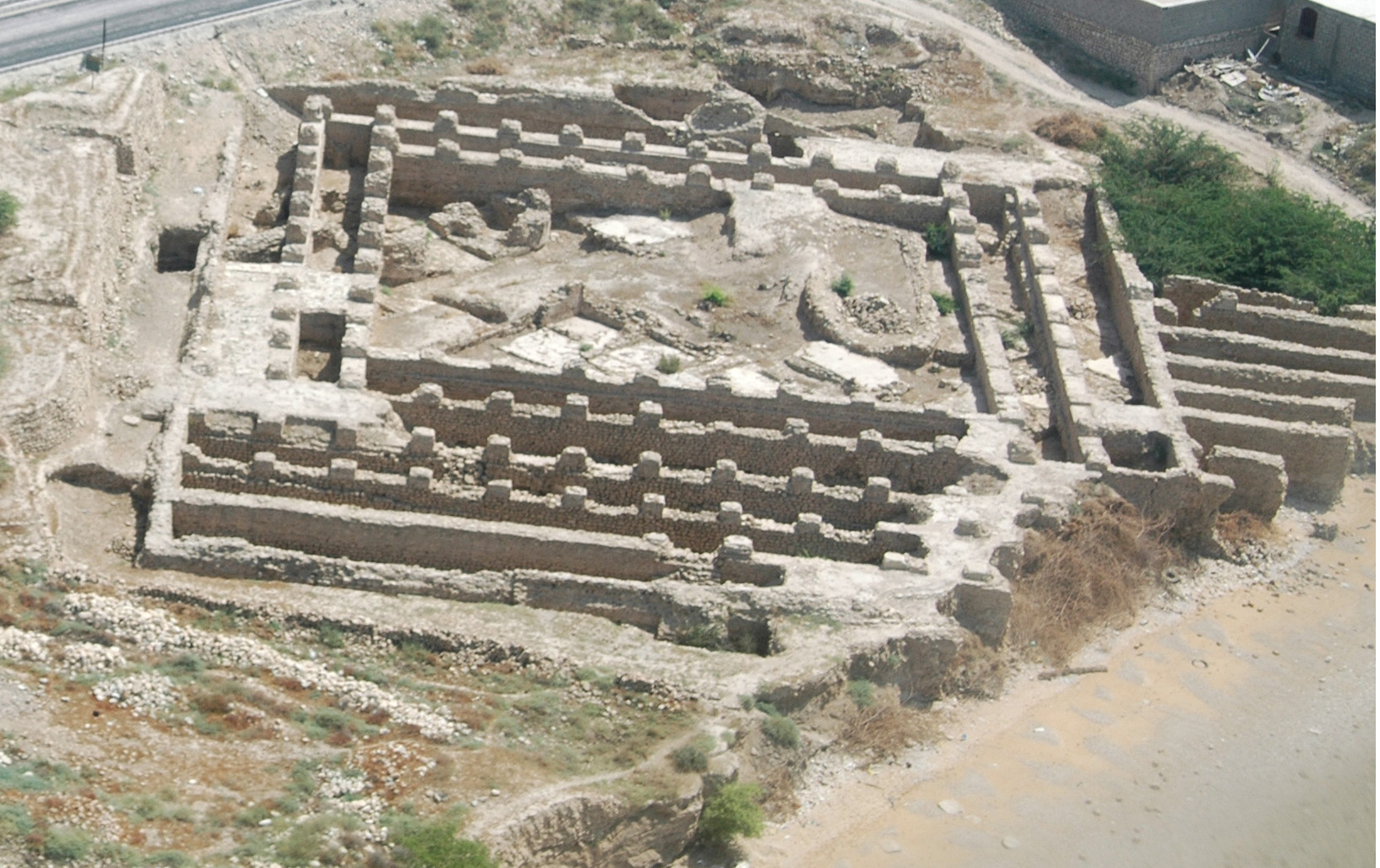
Remains of the Jameh Mosque of Siraf (9th century)

Few of the major mosques built during this early Islamic period in Iran have survived in something close to their original form. Remains of a mosque at Susa, probably from the Abbasid period, show that it had a hypostyle prayer hall (i.e. a hall with many columns supporting a roof) and a courtyard. Another mosque excavated at Siraf dates to the 9th century. Attached to the mosque was a minaret (tower for the muezzin to issue the call to prayer), the base of which remains, constituting the oldest remnants of a minaret in the eastern Islamic world. The Jameh Mosque of Isfahan, one of the major Islamic monuments in Iran, was originally founded towards 771, but it was rebuilt and expanded in 840–841. It too had a courtyard surrounded by hypostyle halls. It continued to undergo further modifications and additions in subsequent centuries.

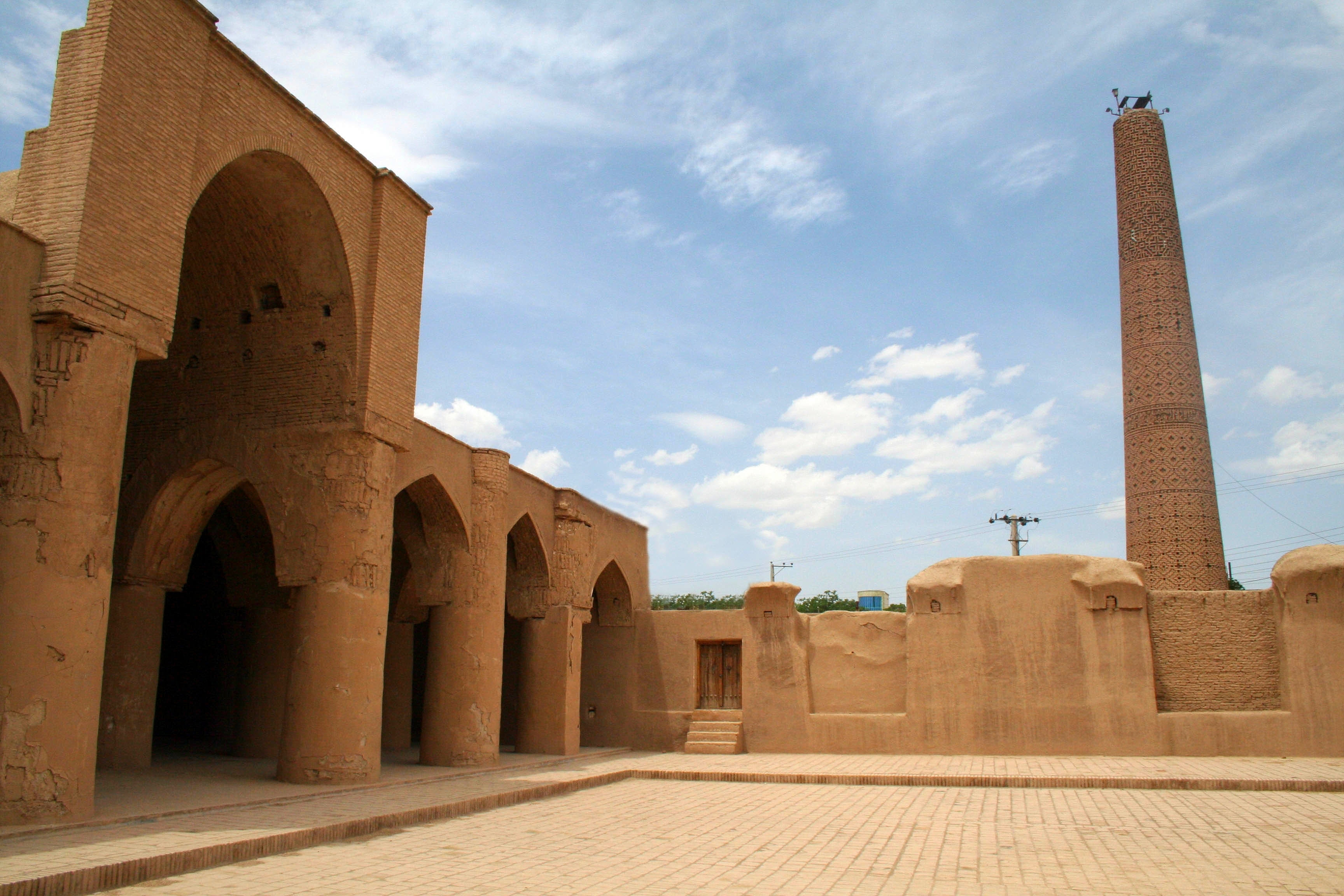
Tarikhaneh Mosque, one of the oldest preserved mosques in Iran

The only major mosque from this early period to preserve some of its original form is the Tarikhaneh Mosque in Damghan. Though the chronology of its construction is not well-documented, its overall form and style may date to the 9th century, or possibly earlier, given its close similarities with Sassanid architecture. It has a courtyard surrounded by a portico and a hypostyle prayer hall where the central aisle leading to the mihrab (a niche in the wall symbolizing the qibla) is slightly wider than the other aisles. It originally had no minaret, but a tall cylindrical tower was added to it in 1026. This minaret is now the oldest one still standing in Iran.

In secular architecture, the remains of various palaces and residences from this period have also been studied, such as those around Merv (present-day Turkmenistan). They shared many features with earlier Sasanian and Sogdian architecture. Among the recurring elements are iwans and domed chambers. Some of the earlier examples up to the 8th century seem to have had halls with wooden pillars and roofs, while those that probably date to the 9th century seem to have favored domes and vaulted ceilings. They also had stucco decoration executed in the styles of Samarra. Residences built in the countryside were enclosed by outer walls with semi-circular towers, while on the inside they had central courtyards or a central domed hall flanked by vaulted halls. Some had four iwans flanking a central courtyard. The Sasanian tradition of building caravanserais along trade routes also continued, with the remains of one such structure in southern Turkmenistan attesting to the presence of a central courtyard surrounded by arcaded galleries with domed roofs.

=== Emergence of regional styles (10th–11th centuries) ===
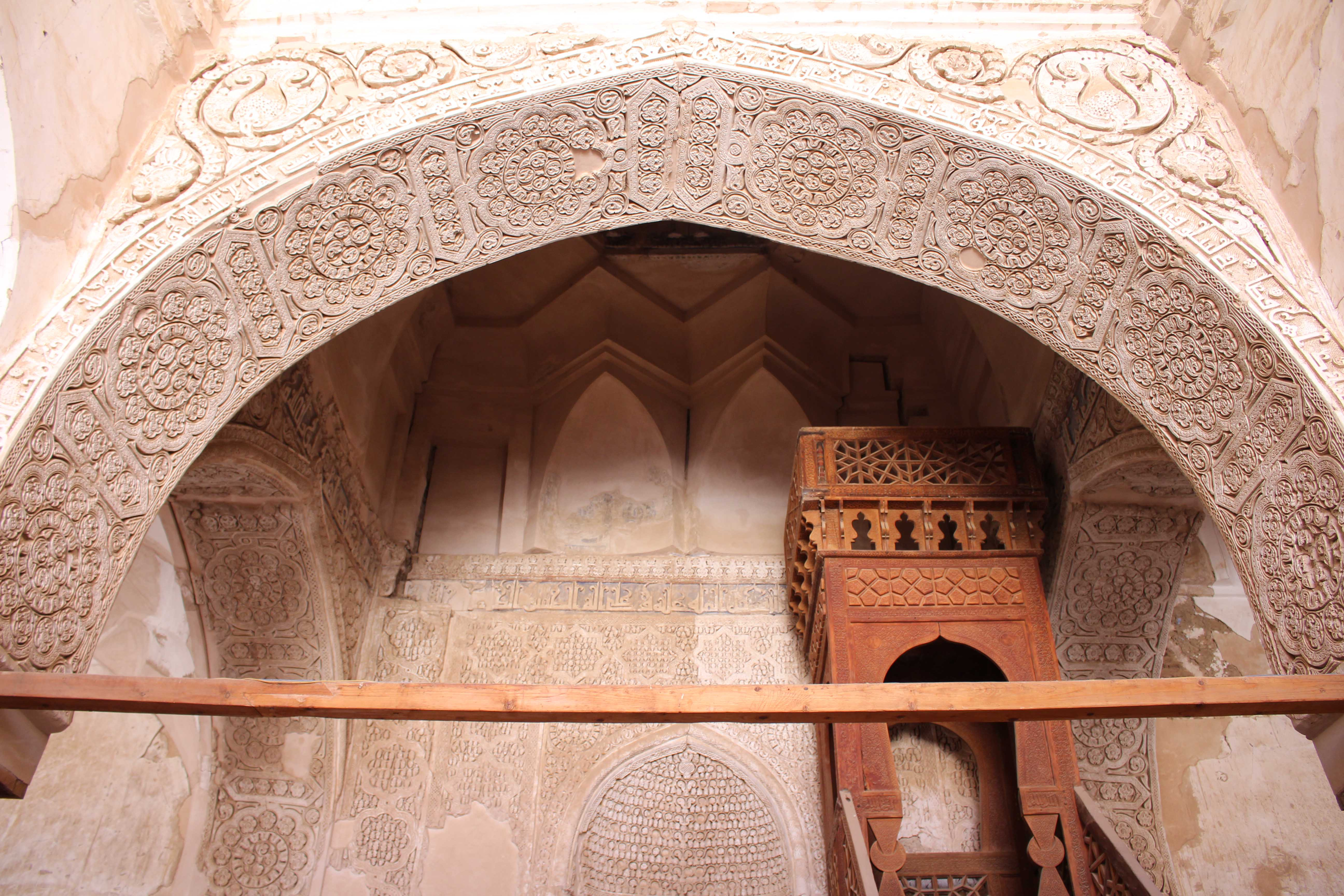
Stucco decoration inside the Jameh Mosque of Na'in (10th century)

After its initial apogee of power, the Abbasid Caliphate fragmented into regional states in the 9th and 10th centuries that were formally obedient to the caliphs in Baghdad but were de facto independent. In Iran and Central Asia, a number of local and regional dynasties rose to power by the 10th century: Iraq and central Iran were controlled by the Buyid dynasty, northern Iran was ruled by the Bawandids and Ziyarids, and the northeastern regions of Khurasan and Transoxiana were ruled by the Samanids, with other dynasties arising in Central Asia soon after.

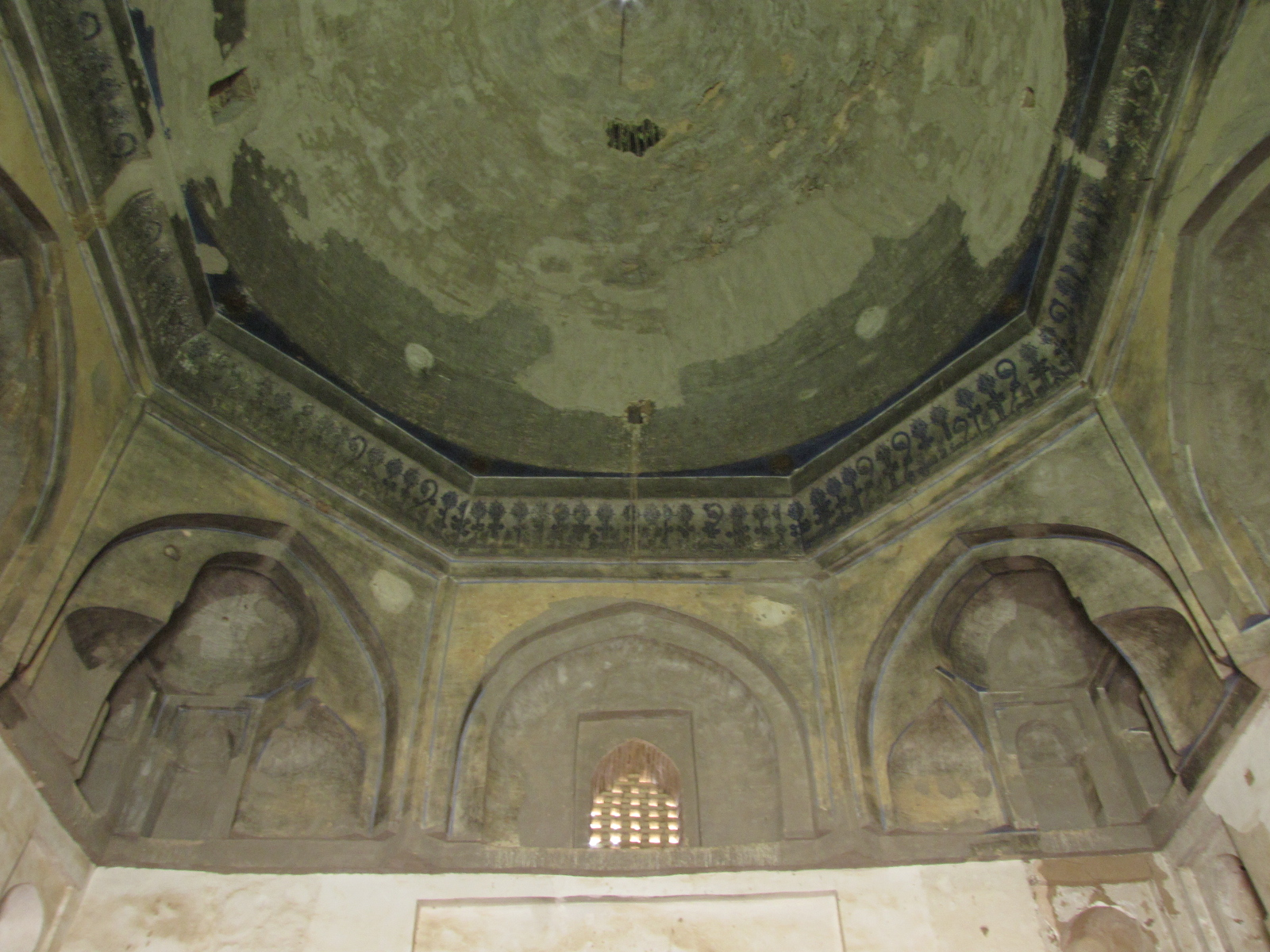
Early example of muqarnas squinches, inside the Davazdah Imam Mausoleum in Yazd (1037–8)

It is around this period that many of the distinctive features of subsequent Iranian and Central Asian architecture first emerged, including the use of baked brick for both construction and decoration, the use of glazed tile for surface decoration, and the development of muqarnas (three-dimensional geometric vaulting) from squinches. Hypostyle mosques continued to be built and there is also evidence of multi-domed mosques, though most mosques were modified or rebuilt in later eras. The Jameh Mosque of Na'in, one of the oldest surviving congregational mosques in Iran, contains some of the best-preserved features from this period, including decorative brickwork, Kufic inscriptions, and rich stucco decoration featuring vine scrolls and acanthus leaves that draw from the earlier styles of Samarra.

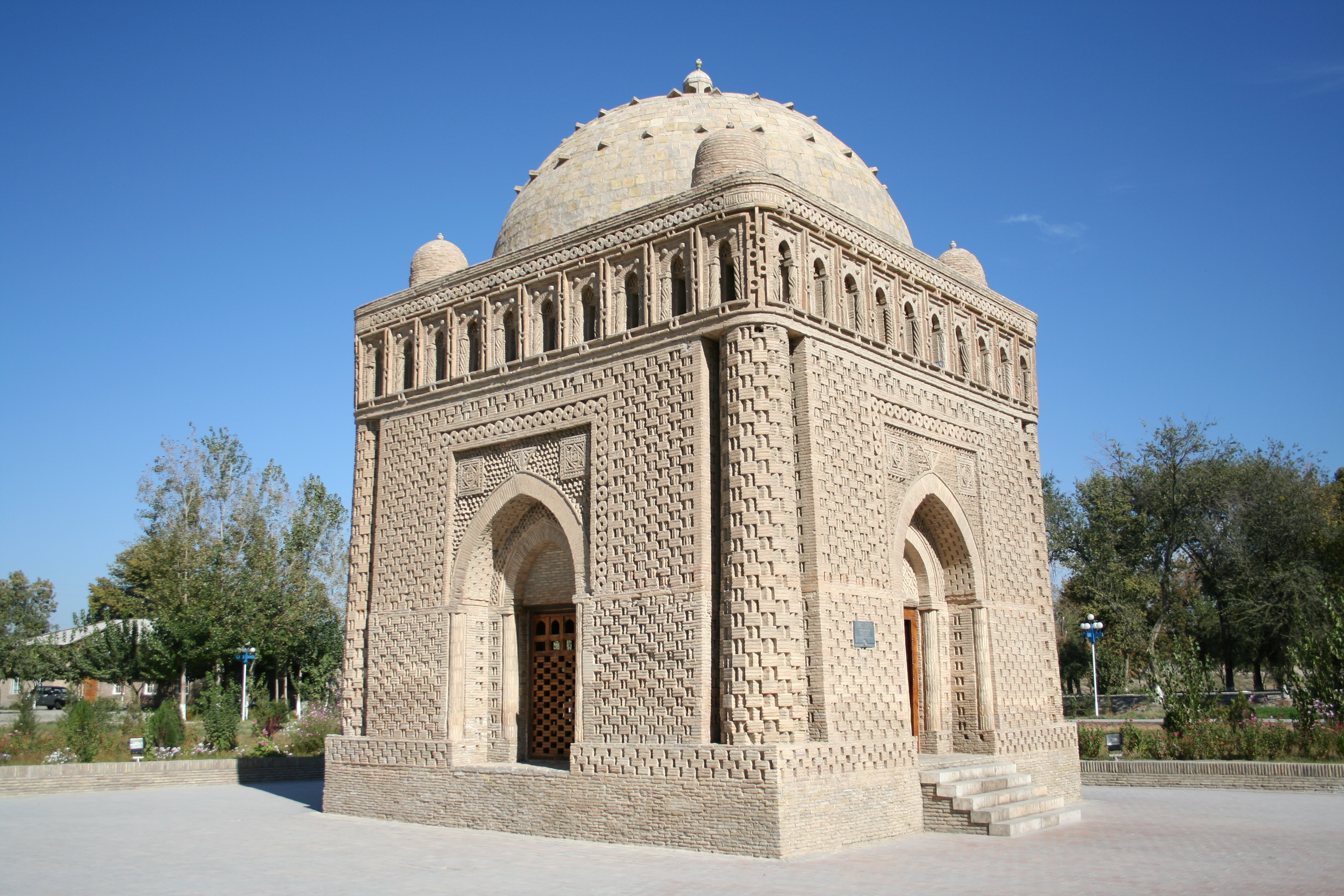
Samanid Mausoleum in Bukhara (10th century), one of the oldest monumental tombs in the Islamic world.

Another important architectural trend to arise in the 10th to 11th centuries is the development of mausolea, which took on monumental forms for the first time. One type of mausoleum was the tomb tower, such as the Gonbad-e Qabus (circa 1006–7), while the other main type was the domed square, such as the Samanid Mausoleum in Bukhara (before 943).

=== Seljuk era (11th–13th centuries) ===
Turkic peoples began moving west across Central Asia and towards West Asia from the 8th century onward, eventually converting to Islam and becoming major forces in the region. The most significant of these were the Seljuk Turks, who formed the Seljuk Empire in the 11th century, conquering all of Iran and other extensive territories in Central and West Asia.

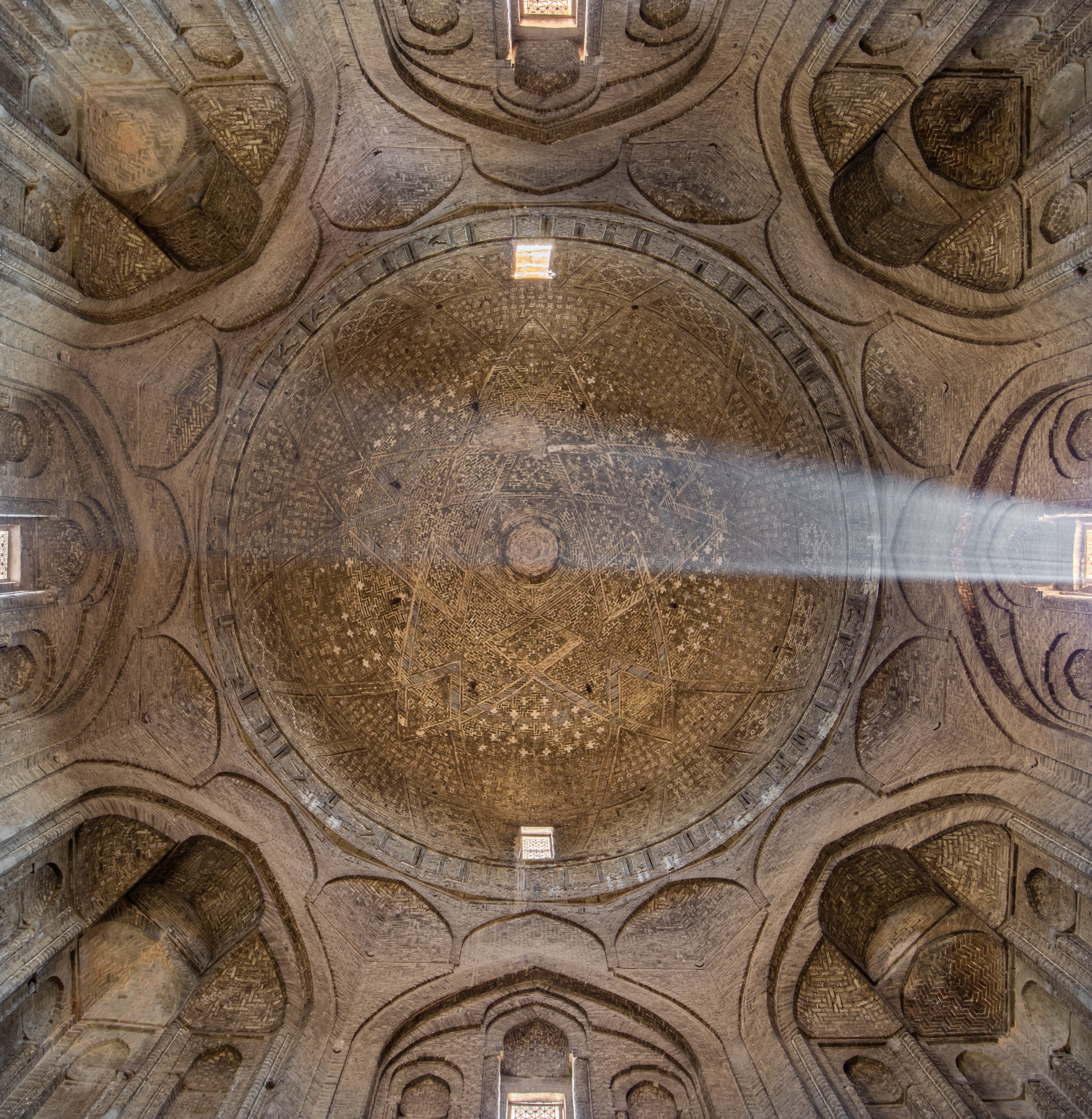
Northern domed chamber in the Jameh Mosque of Isfahan, built in 1088–89 under patronage of the Seljuk vizier Taj al-Mulk

While the apogee of the Great Seljuks was short-lived, it represents a major benchmark in the history of Islamic art and architecture in Iran and Central Asia, inaugurating an expansion of patronage and of artistic forms. Much of the Seljuk architectural heritage was destroyed during the Mongol invasions in the 13th century. Nonetheless, compared to pre-Seljuk Iran, a larger volume of surviving monuments and artifacts from the Seljuk period has allowed scholars to study the arts of this era in greater depth. Several neighbouring dynasties and empires contemporary with the Seljuks, including the Qarakhanids, the Ghaznavids, and the Ghurids, built monuments in a very similar style. A general tradition of architecture was thus shared across most of the eastern Islamic world (Iran, Central Asia, and parts of the northern Indian subcontinent) throughout the Seljuk period and its decline, from the 11th to 13th centuries. This period is also regarded as a "classical" age of Central Asian architecture.

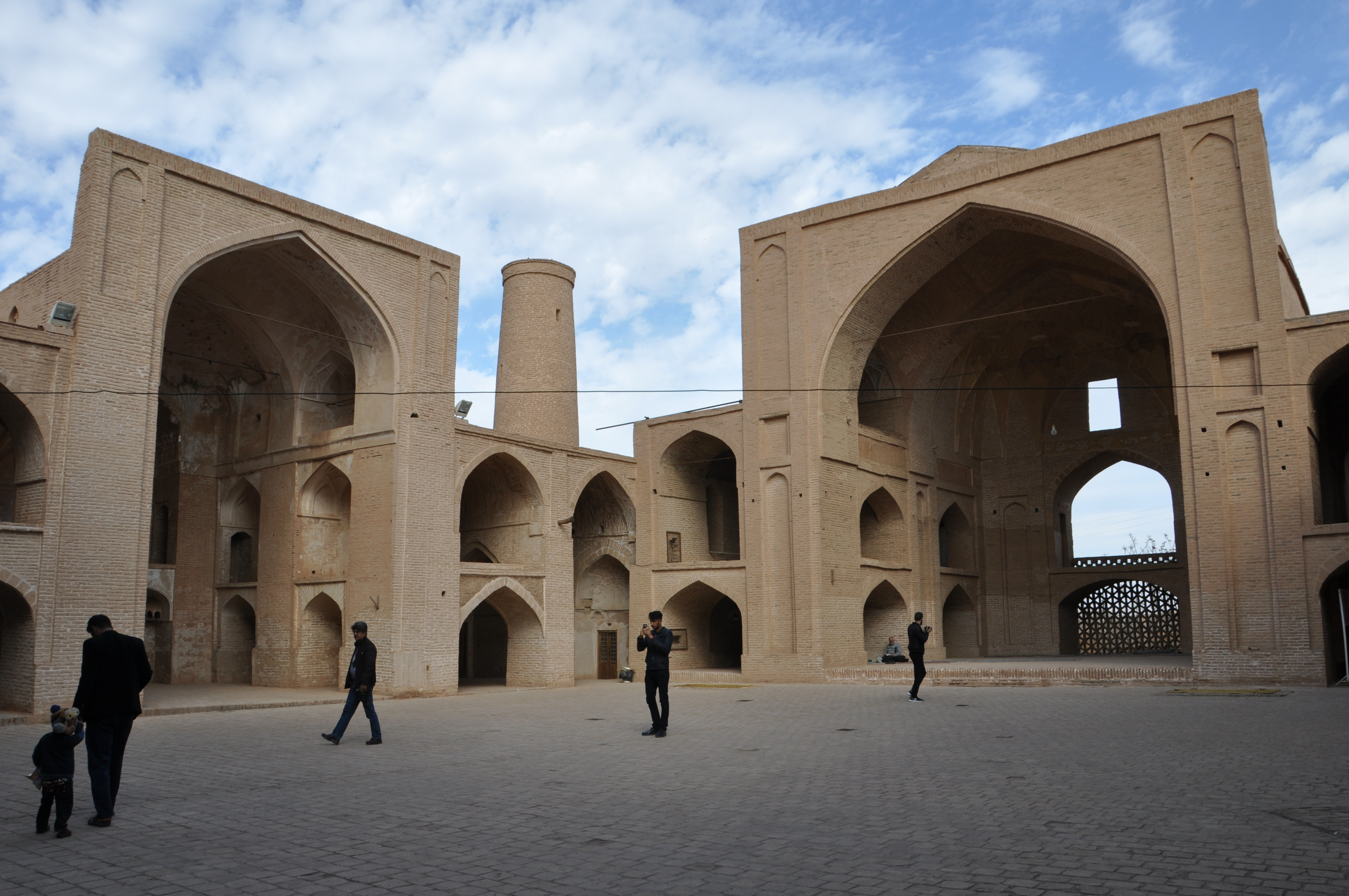
Courtyard of the Jameh Mosque of Ardestan, one of the mosques given a four-iwan layout during the Seljuk period (1158–1160)

The most important religious monument from the Great Seljuk period is the Jameh Mosque of Isfahan, which was expanded and modified by various Seljuk patrons in the late 11th century and early 12th century. Two major and innovative domed chambers were added to it in the late 11th century. Four large iwans were then erected around the courtyard around the early 12th century, giving rise to the four-iwan plan in mosque architecture. The four-iwan plan quickly became popular and was applied to other major mosques around this time, including those of Ardestan and Zavareh, as well as in secular architecture. It was probably also used for madrasas, a new type of building introduced around this time, though none of the Seljuk madrasas have been well preserved.

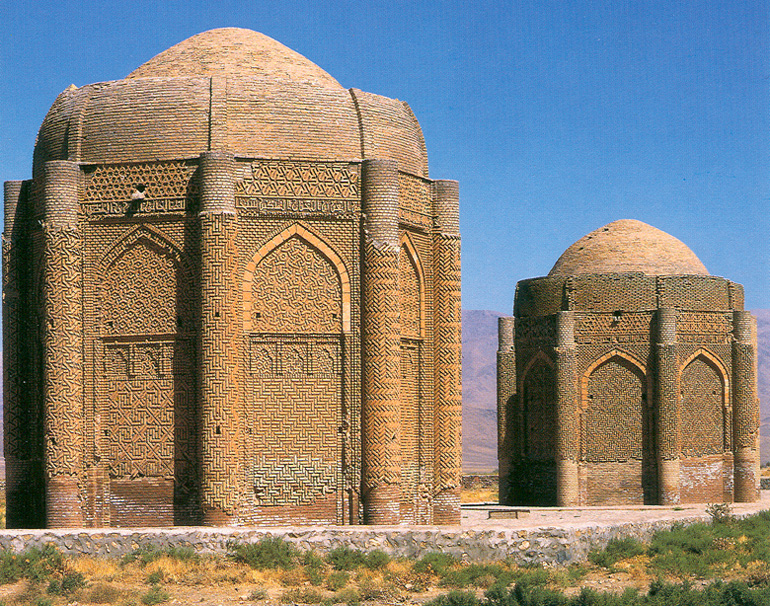
The Kharraqan twin towers or mausoleums near Qazvin, built in 1068 and 1093 (Seljuk period)

Lodging places (khān, or caravanserai) for travellers and their animals, generally displayed utilitarian rather than ornamental architecture, with rubble masonry, strong fortifications, and minimal comfort. Large caravanserais were built as a way to foster trade and assert Seljuk authority in the countryside. They typically consisted of a building with a fortified exterior appearance, monumental entrance portal, and interior courtyard surrounded by various halls, including iwans. Some notable examples, only partly preserved, are the caravanserais of Ribat-i Malik (c. 1068–1080) and Ribat-i Sharaf (12th century) in Transoxiana and Khorasan, respectively.

The Seljuks also continued to build "tower tombs", an Iranian building type from earlier periods, such as the Toghrul Tower built in Ray (south of present-day Tehran) in 1139. More innovative, however, was the introduction of mausoleums with a square or polygonal floor plan, which later became a common form of monumental tombs. Early examples of this are the two Kharraqan Towers (1068 and 1093) near Qazvin (northern Iran), which have octagonal forms, and the large Mausoleum of Sanjar (c. 1152) in Merv (present-day Turkmenistan), which has a square base.

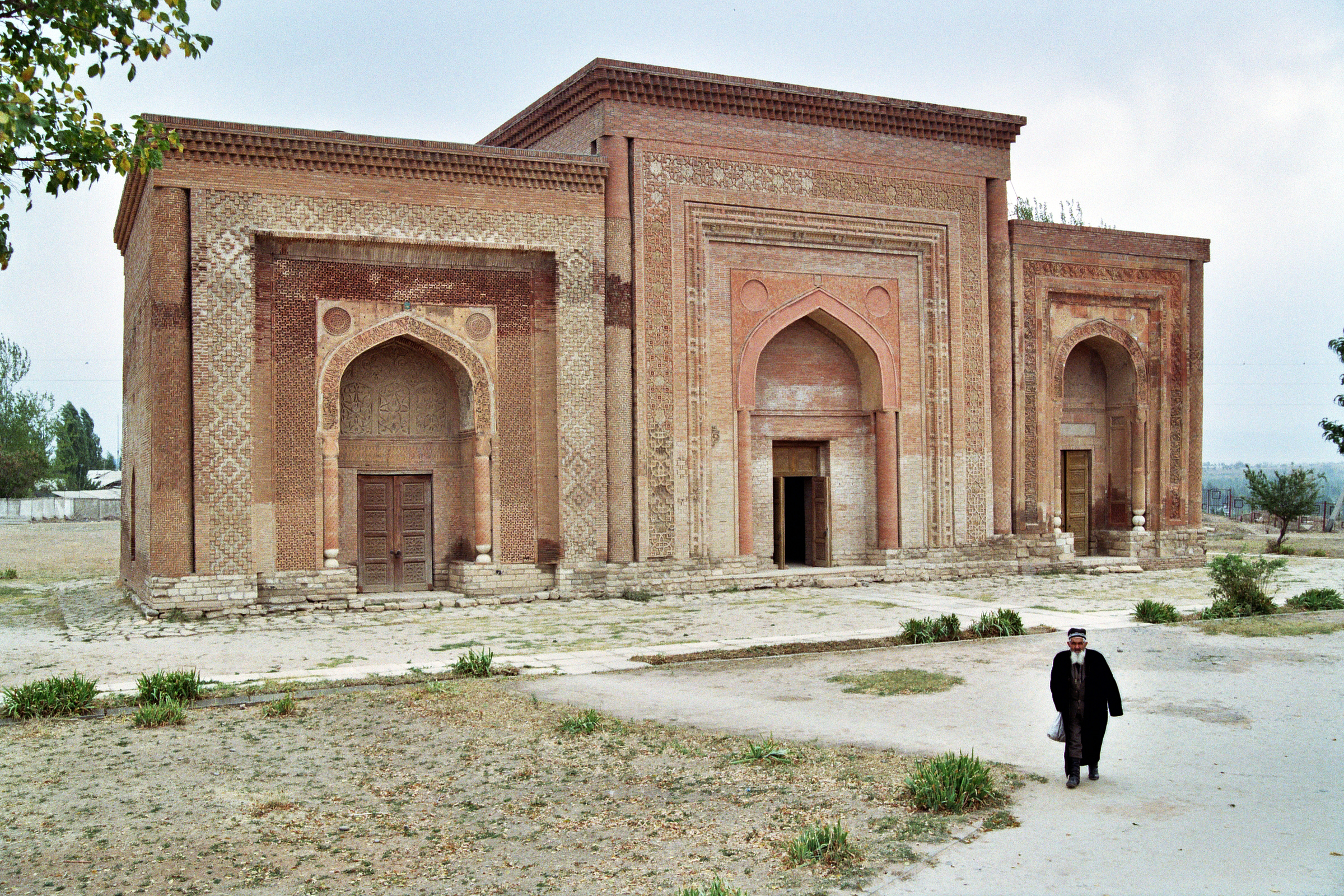
Qarakhanid Mausoleums in Uzgen, Kyrgyzstan, second half of the 12th century

Around the same time, between the late 10th century and the early 13th century, the Turkic Qarakhanids ruled in Transoxiana and executed many impressive constructions in Bukhara and Samarkand (present-day Uzbekistan). Among the known Qarakhanid monuments are the great congregational mosque in Bukhara, of which only the Kalyan Minaret (c. 1127) survives, the nearby Minaret of Vabkent (1141), and several Qarakhanid mausoleums with monumental façades, such as those in Uzgen (present-day Kyrgyzstan) from the second half of the 12th century.

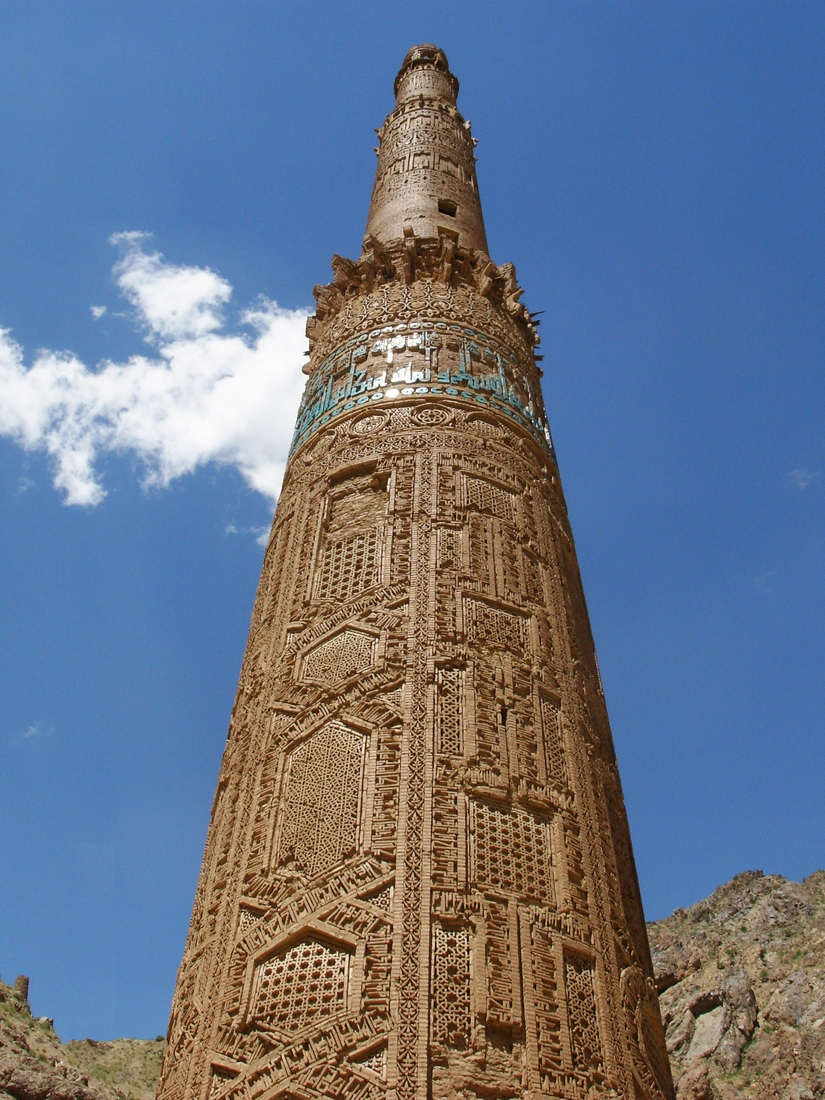
Minaret of Jam in present-day Afghanistan, built in the late 12th century (Ghurid period)

Further east, the first major Turkic dynasty was the Ghaznavids, who became independent in the late 10th century and ruled from Ghazna, in present-day Afghanistan. In the second half of the 12th century, the Ghurids replaced them as the major power in the region from northern India to the edge of the Caspian Sea. Among the most remarkable monuments of these two dynasties are a number of ornate brick towers and minarets which have survived as stand-alone structures. Their exact functions are unclear. They include the Tower of Mas'ud III near Ghazna (early 12th century) and the Minaret of Jam built by the Ghurids (late 12th century), also in present-day Afghanistan.

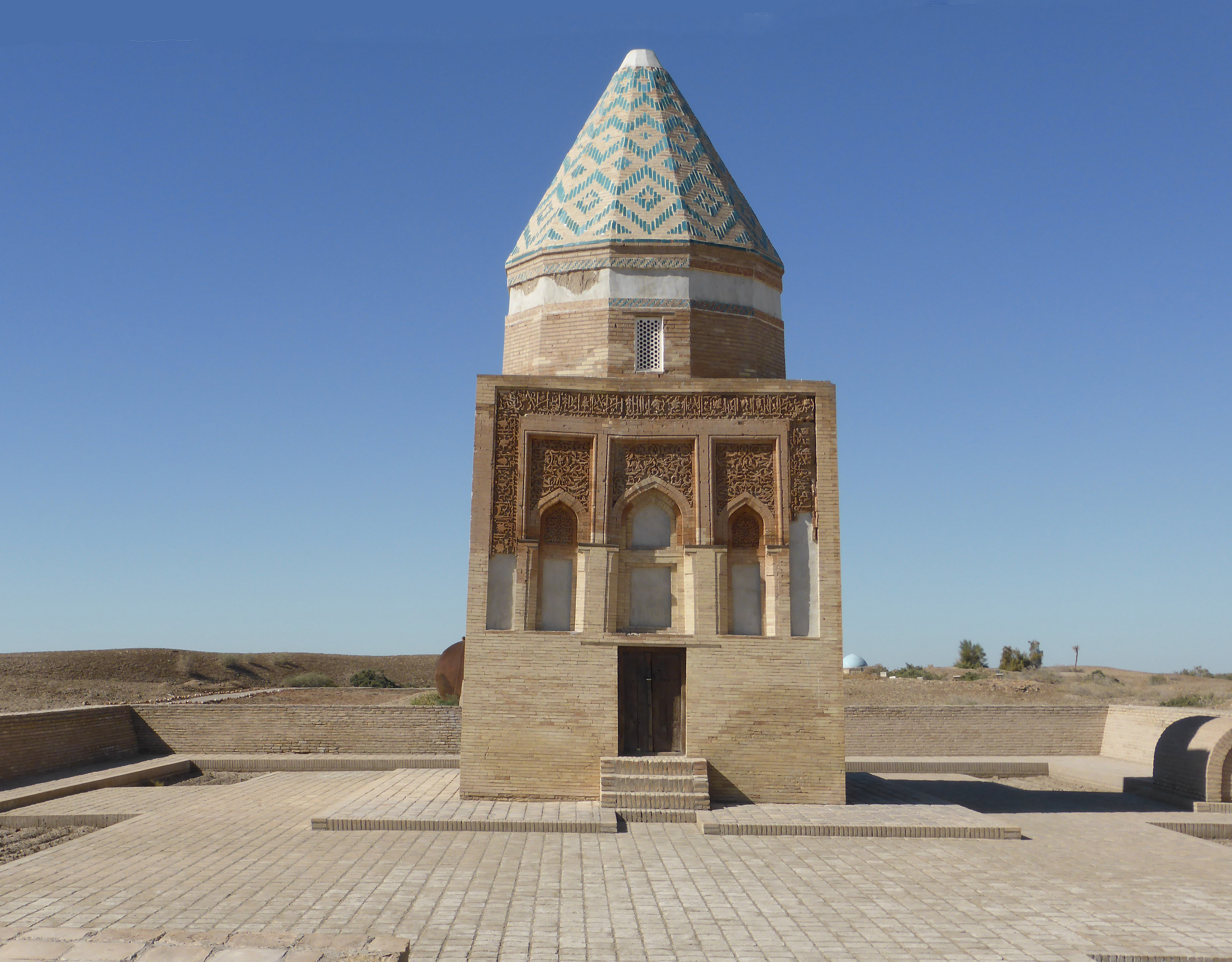
Mausoleum of Fakhr al-Din Razi or Il-Arslan in Kunya-Urgench, Turkmenistan, late 12th or early 13th century (Khwarazmian Empire period)

As the Great Seljuks declined in the 12th century, various other dynasties (often also of Turkic origin) formed smaller states and empires. In Iran and Central Asia, the Khwarazm-Shahs, formerly vassals of the Seljuks and Qara Khitai, took advantage of this to expand their power and form the Khwarazmian Empire, occupying much of the region and conquering the Ghurids in the early 13th century, only to fall soon after to the Mongol invasions. The site of the former Khwarazmian capital, Kunya-Urgench (in present-day Turkmenistan), has preserved several monuments from the Khwarazmian Empire period (late 12th and early 13th century), including the so-called Mausoleum of Fakhr al-Din Razi (possibly the tomb of Il-Arslan) and the Mausoleum of Sultan Tekesh.

=== Ilkhanids (13th–14th centuries) ===
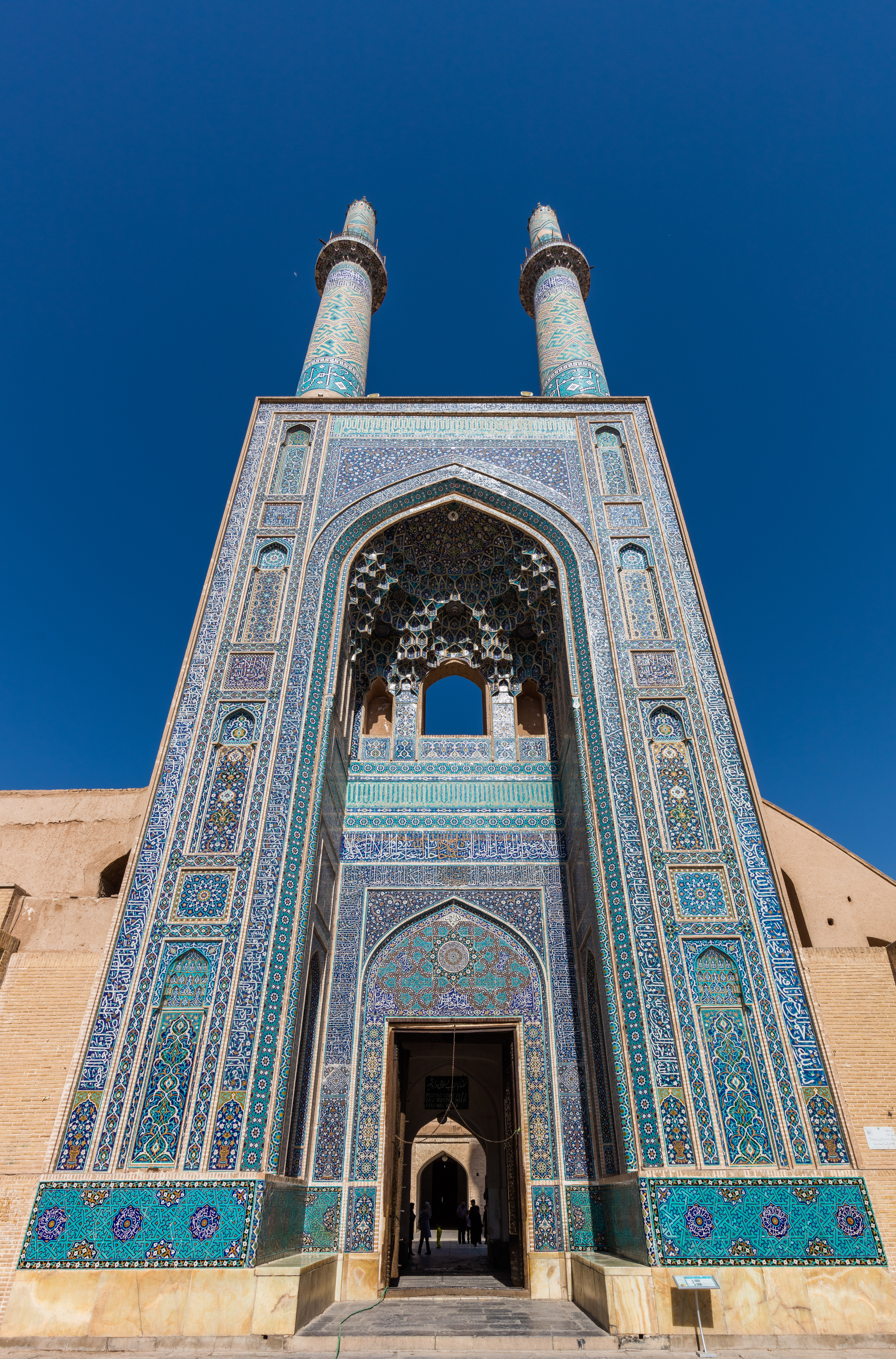
Entrance portal with muqarnas vaulting, twin minarets, and tile decoration at the Jameh Mosque of Yazd, Ilkhanid period (14th century)

From the 13th century to the early 16th century, Iran and Central Asia came under the control of two major dynasties descended from the Mongol conqueror Genghis Khan, the Ilkhanate (1256–1353) and the Timurids (1370–1506). This period saw the construction of some of the largest and most ambitious Iranian monuments of the Islamic world. The Ilkhanids were initially traditional nomadic Mongols, but at the end of the 13th century, Ghazan Khan (r. 1295–1304) converted to Islam and aided a cultural and economic resurgence in which urban Iranian culture was of primary importance. Ilkhanid vassals, like the Muzaffarids and the Jalayirids, also sponsored new constructions.

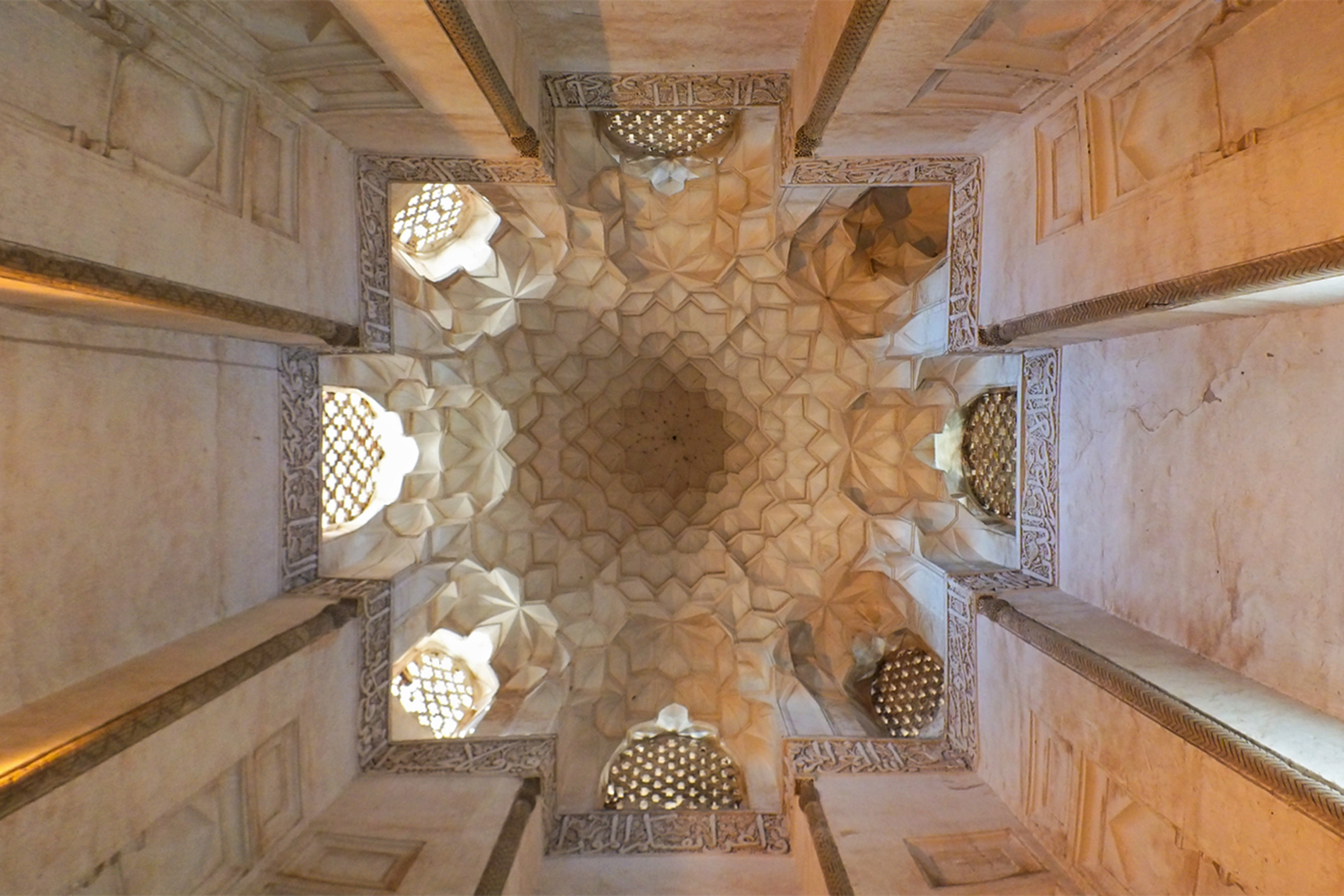
Muqarnas dome inside the Mausoleum of Shaykh 'Abd al-Samad in Natanz (1307–8)

Ilkhanid architecture elaborated earlier Iranian traditions. In particular, greater attention was given to interior spaces and how to organize them. Rooms were made taller, while transverse vaulting was employed and walls were opened with arches, thus allowing more light and air inside. Muqarnas, which was previously confined to covering limited transitional elements like squinches, was now used to cover entire domes and vaults for purely decorative effect. The Tomb of 'Abd al-Samad in Natanz (1307–8), for example, is covered inside by an elaborate muqarnas dome that is made from stucco suspended below the pyramidal vault that roofs the building.

Brick remained the main construction material, but more color was added through the use of tile mosaic, which involved cutting monochrome tiles of different colors into pieces that were then fitted together to form larger patterns, especially geometric motifs and floral motifs. Carved stucco decoration also continued. Some exceptional examples in Iran come from this period, including a wall of carved stucco in the Mausoleum of Pir-i Bakran in Linjan (near Isfahan), and a mihrab added in 1310 to the Jameh Mosque of Isfahan. The latter is one of the masterpieces of Islamic sculptural art from this era, featuring multiple layers of deeply-carved vegetal motifs, along with a carved inscription.

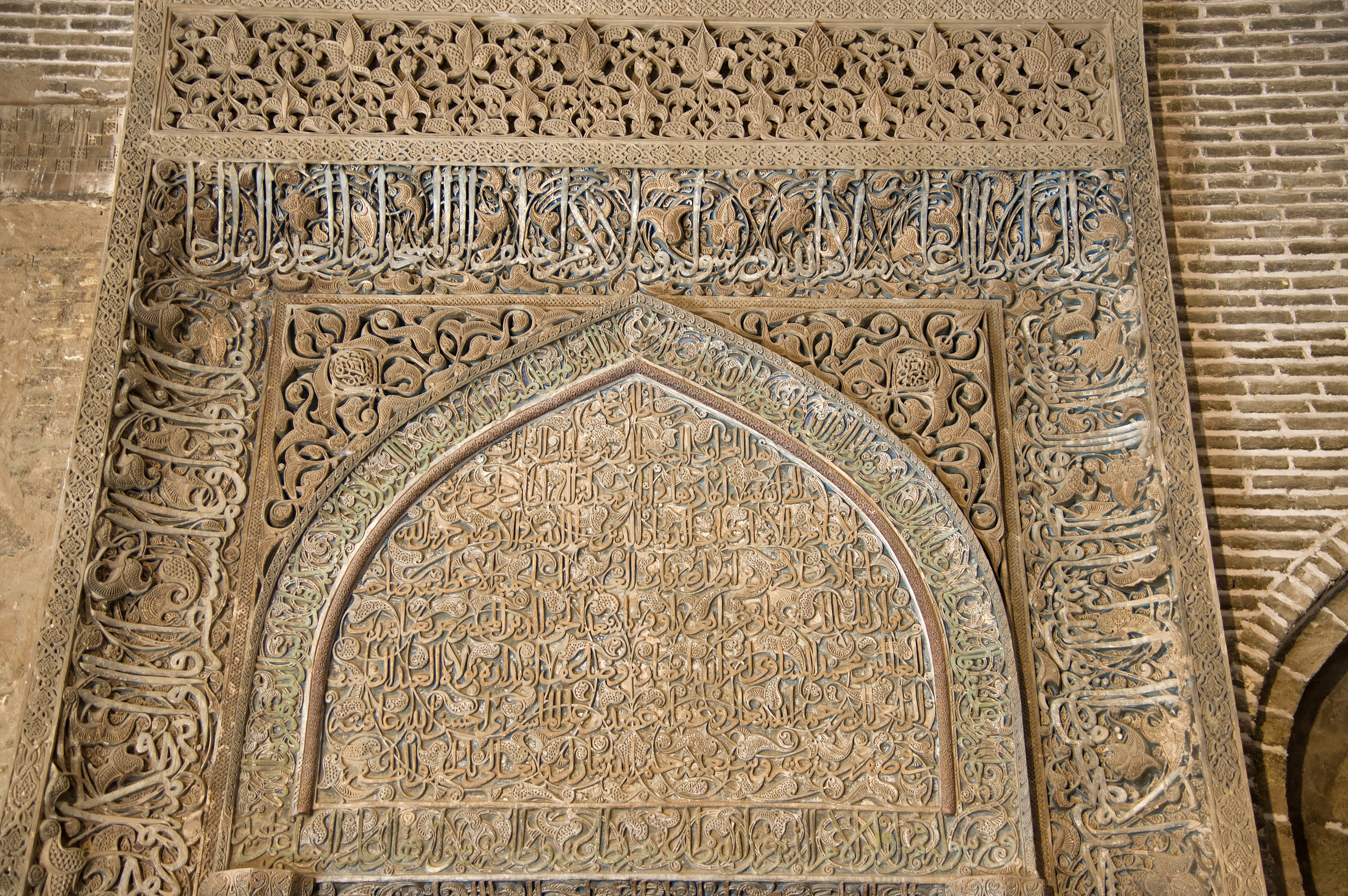
Details of the carved stucco mihrab added by the Ilkhanids in 1310 to the Jameh Mosque in Isfahan

Various mosques were built or expanded during this period, usually following the four-iwan plan for congregational mosques (e.g. at Varamin and Kerman), except in the northwest, where cold winters discouraged the presence of an open courtyard, as at the Jameh Mosque of Ardabil (now ruined). Another hallmark of the Ilkhanid period is the introduction of monumental mosque portals topped by twin minarets, as seen at the Jameh Mosque of Yazd. Caravanserais were built again, although the Khan al-Mirjan in Baghdad is the only surviving example.

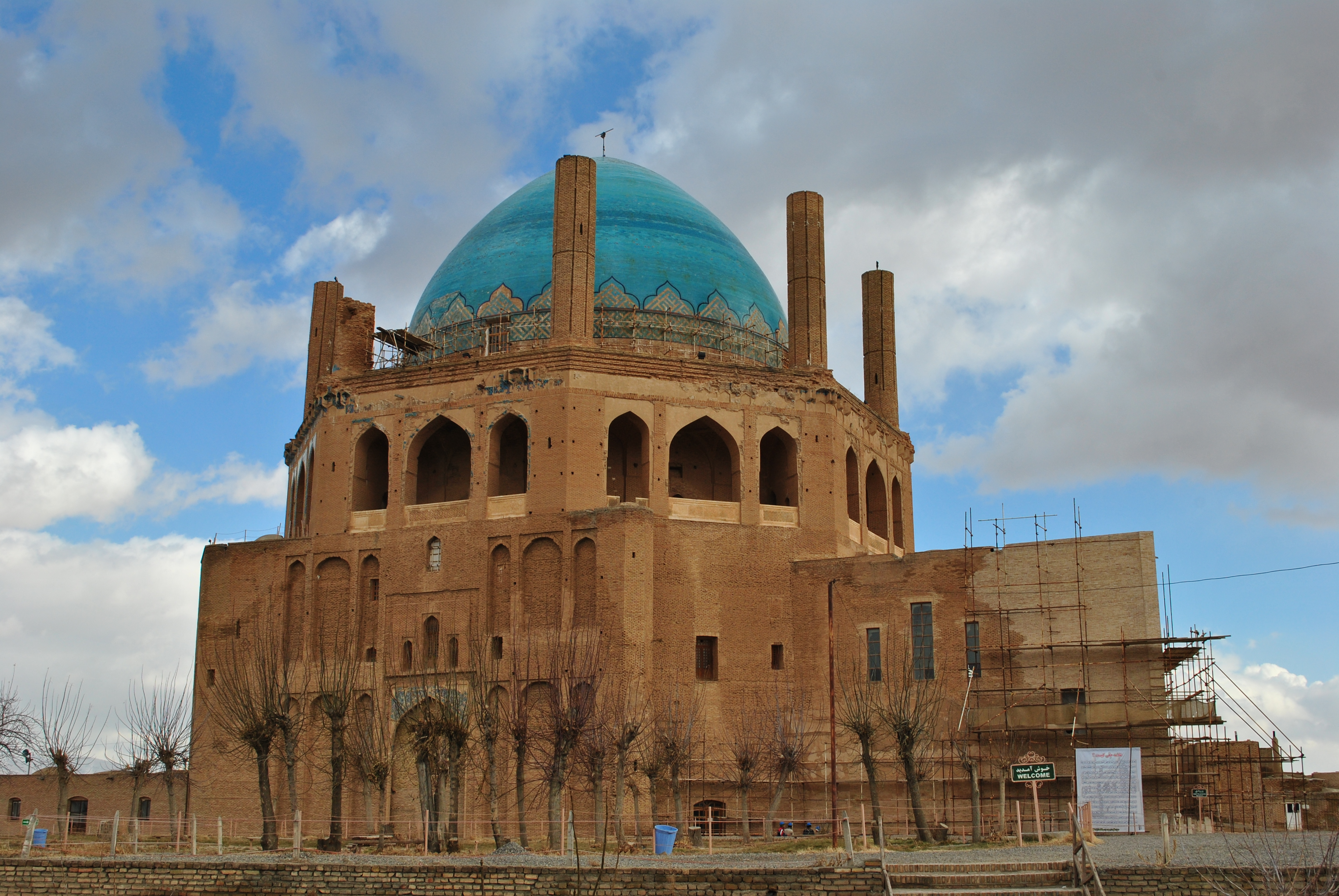
Mausoleum of Uljaytu at Soltaniyeh (early 14th century)

The most impressive monument to survive from this period is the Soltaniyeh Mausoleum built for Sultan Uljaytu (r. 1304–1317), a massive dome supported on a multi-level octagonal structure with internal and external galleries. Only the domed building remains today, missing much of its original turquoise tile decoration, but it was once the centerpiece of a larger religious complex including a mosque, a hospital, and living areas. Smaller tombs and shrines in honour of local Sufis were also built or renovated by Ilkhanid patrons, such as the shrine of Bayazid Bastami in the town of Bastam, the aforementioned Mausoleum of Pir-i Bakran, and the aforementioned Tomb of Abd-al-Samad. Also in Bastam, the Ilkhanids built a traditional tower tomb to house the remains of Uljaytu's infant son. Unusually, rather than being an independent structure, the tomb was erected behind the qibla wall of the town's main mosque – a configuration also found in some contemporary Mamluk architecture.

=== Timurids (14th–15th centuries) ===
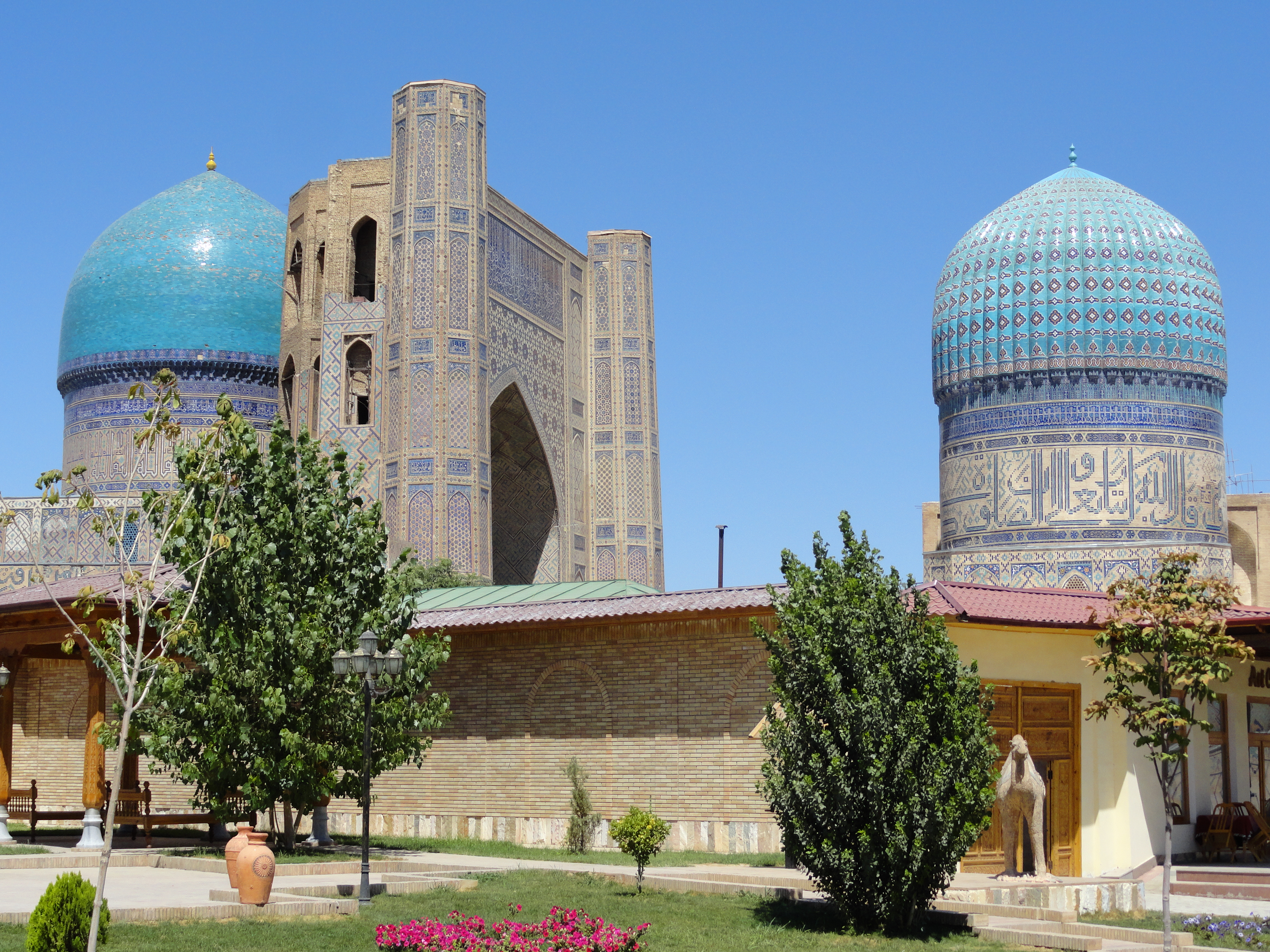
Bibi Khanum Mosque in Samarkand (1399–1405)

The Timurid Empire, created by Timur (r. 1370–1405), oversaw another cultural renaissance. Timurid architecture continued the tradition of Ilkhanid architecture, building monuments once again on a grand scale and with lavish decoration made to impress, but they also refined previous designs and techniques. Timurid rulers recruited the best craftsmen from their conquered territories or even forced them to move to the Timurid capital.

Brick continued to be used as construction material. To cover large brick surfaces with colorful decoration, the banna'i technique was used to create geometric patterns and Kufic inscriptions at relatively low cost, while more expensive tile mosaic continued to be used for floral patterns. Tiles were preferred on the outside, while interior walls could be covered with carved or painted plaster instead.

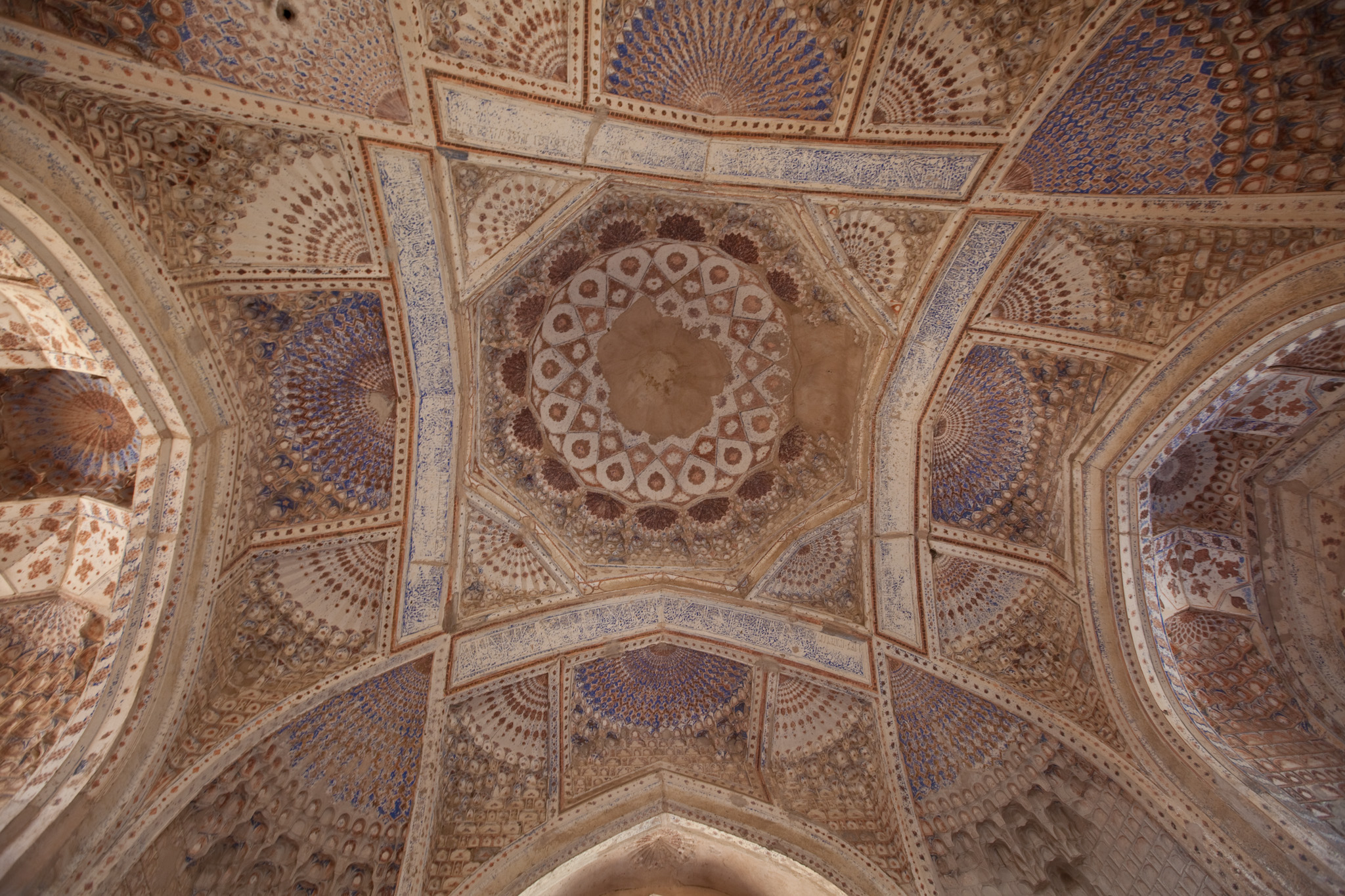
Vaulting inside the Gawhar Shad Mausoleum in Herat (early 15th century)

Among the most important Timurid innovations was the more sophisticated and fluid arrangement of geometric vaulting. Large vaults were divided by intersecting ribs into smaller vaults which could then be further subdivided or filled with muqarnas and other types of decoration. Muqarnas itself also became even more complex by using smaller individual cells to create the larger three-dimensional geometric plan. Visual balance could be achieved by alternating one type or pattern of decoration with another between the different subdivisions of the vault. By combining these vaulting techniques with a cruciform plan and by breaking the solid mass of supporting walls with open arches and windows, a strict division between dome, squinch, and wall was dissolved and an endless diversity of elaborate interior spaces could be created.

The most significant preserved Timurid monuments are found in and around the cities of Khorasan and Transoxiana, including Samarkand, Bukhara, Herat, and Mashhad. Timur's own monuments are distinguished by their size; notably, the Bibi Khanum Mosque and the Gur-e Amir Mausoleum, both in Samarkand, and his imposing but now-ruined Ak-Saray Palace at Shahr-i Sabz. The Gur-e Amir Mausoleum and the Bibi Khanum Mosque are distinguished by their lavish interior and exterior decoration, their imposing portals, and their prominent dome. The domes are supported on tall, cylindrical drums and have a pointed, bulging profile, sometimes fluted or ribbed.

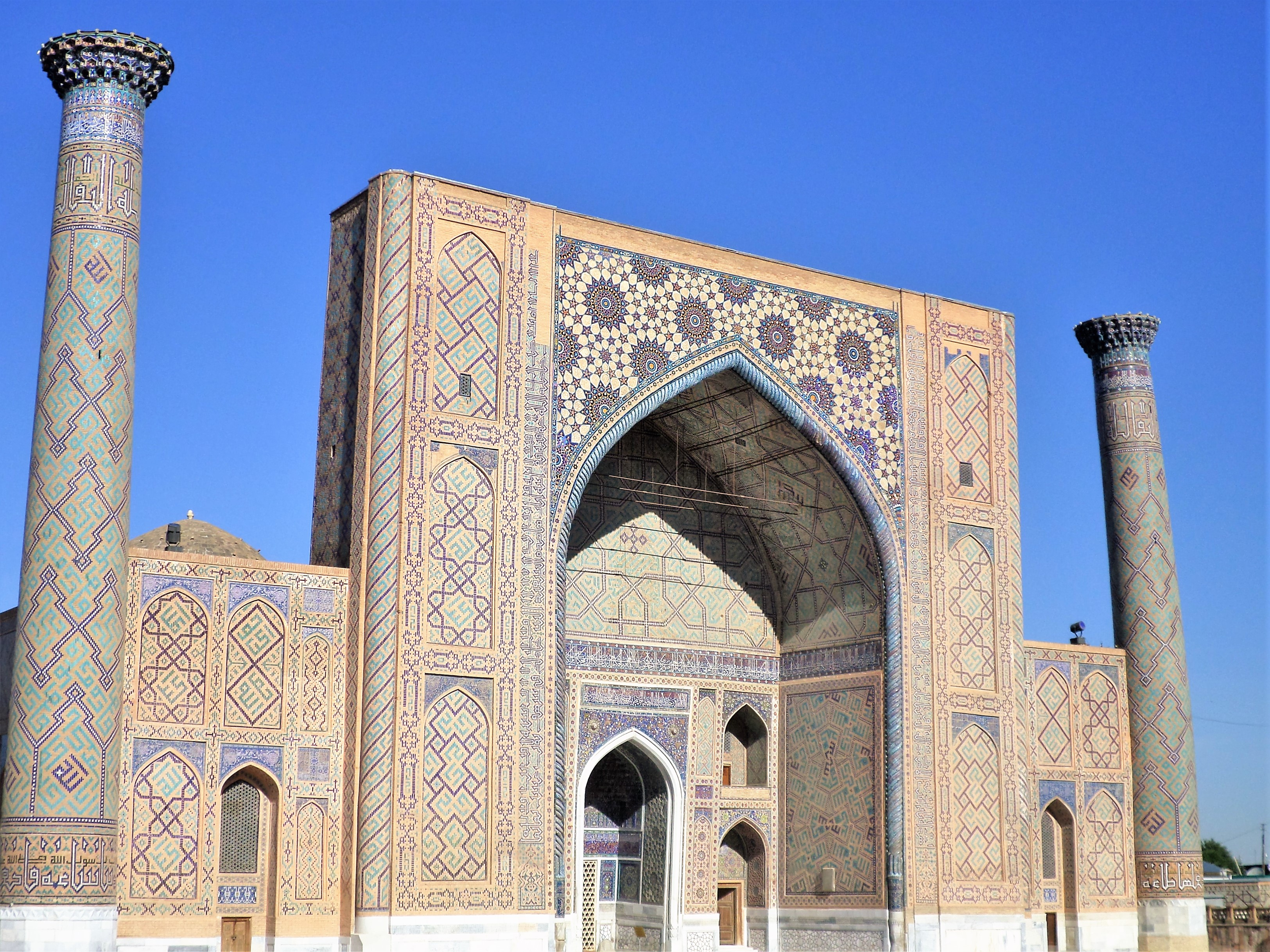
Façade of the Ulugh Beg Madrasa at the Registan in Samarkand (1417–1420)

Timur's successors built on a somewhat smaller scale, but under the patronage of Gawhar Shad, the wife of his son Shah Rukh (r. 1405–1447), Timurid architecture attained the height of sophistication during the first half of the 15th century. Her monuments were mainly found in Mashhad and Herat, though some have been destroyed or severely damaged since the 19th century, including her mausoleum and mosque complex (1417–1438). Some of the surviving vaulting and decoration inside her mausoleum is nonetheless indicative of its original quality.

Under Ulugh Beg (r. 1447–1449), the Registan Square in Samarkand was first transformed into a monumental complex similar to what it is today. He built three structures around the square, of which only the Ulugh Beg Madrasa (1417–1420) survives today (two other monumental structures were erected around the square at later periods), with a large façade covered by a rich variety of decoration.

Timurid patronage was of high importance in the history of art and architecture across a wide part of the Islamic world. The international Timurid style was eventually integrated into the visual culture of the rising Ottoman Empire in the west, while to the east it was transmitted to the Indian subcontinent by the Mughals, who were descended from Timur.

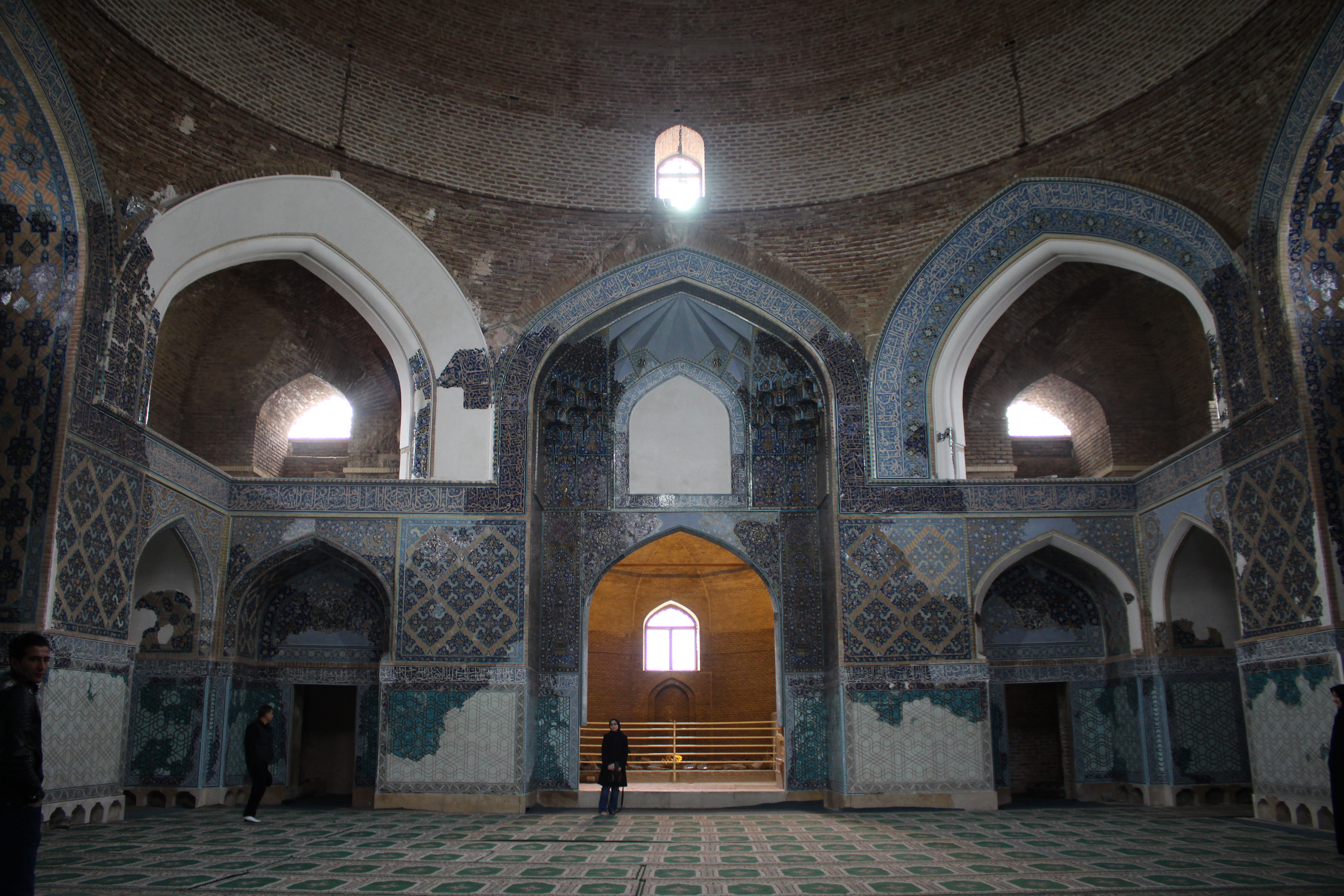
Interior of the Blue Mosque in Tabriz (1465), built by the Qara Qoyunlu

During the late 14th and 15th centuries, western Iran was dominated by two powerful Turkoman confederations, the Qara Qoyunlu and the Aq Qoyunlu. While few monuments sponsored by either faction have been preserved, what does remain shows that the Timurid style was already spreading westward during this period. One of the most significant Qara Qoyunlu monuments is the Blue Mosque or Muzaffariya Mosque (1465) in Tabriz, now partly ruined. It has an unusual T-shaped layout around a central dome, not unlike the Ottoman Green Mosque in Bursa, and is decorated with a revetment of very high-quality tilework in six colours, including a deep blue.

=== Safavids and Uzbeks (16th–18th centuries) ===
The Safavids, who forged a large Shi'i empire in the 16th century that encompassed all of Iran and some neighbouring regions, initially inherited the traditions of Timurid architecture. To adapt this tradition into a new imperial style, Safavid architects pushed it to an even grander scale. Safavid architecture simplified Timurid architecture to an extent, creating large architectural ensembles that are arranged around more static, fixed perspectives that appear more ceremonial, with more uniform building exteriors and more streamlined vault designs. At the same time, buildings were carefully planned and often given an open layout that made them easy to enjoy. The most characteristic decoration was tile mosaic, applied on a grand scale. The decorative program often served to obscure rather than highlight the structural design of buildings. This Safavid style took shape in Isfahan and subsequently spread to other parts of the empire.

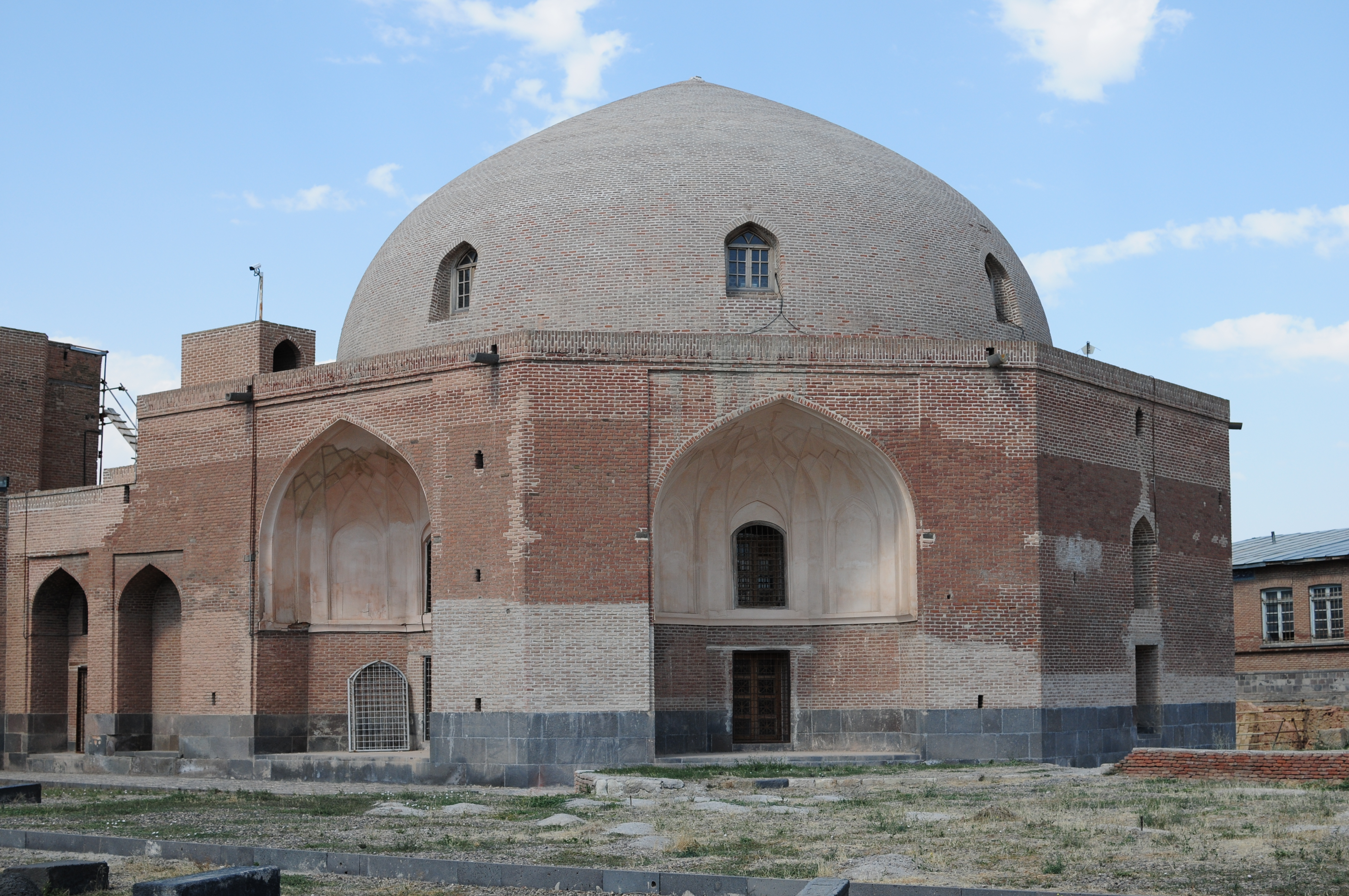
Exterior of the Jannat Sarai (16th century), an early Safavid construction, added by Tahmasp I to the shrine complex of Sheikh Safi al-Din in Ardabil

Relatively few Safavid monuments have been preserved from before the period prior to the reign of Shah Abbas I (r. 1588–1629). The most important exception is the tomb and religious complex of Sheikh Safi al-Din in Ardabil. This complex had been in development since the time of Safi al-Din (d. 1334), who founded a Sufi order with which Isma'il I (r. 1501–1524), the first Safavid ruler, associated himself. Safavid additions to the site began in the early 16th century, when Isma'il's small domed tomb was built here. His successor, Tahmasp I (r. 1524–1576), carried out the first major Safavid expansion of the complex. The most important structure added was the Jannat Sarai, a large octagonal structure in the same tradition as the old Ilkhanid mausoleum in Soltaniyeh, perhaps originally intended to be the domed tomb of Tahmasp I. Abbas I also made further renovations and additions to the site after this.

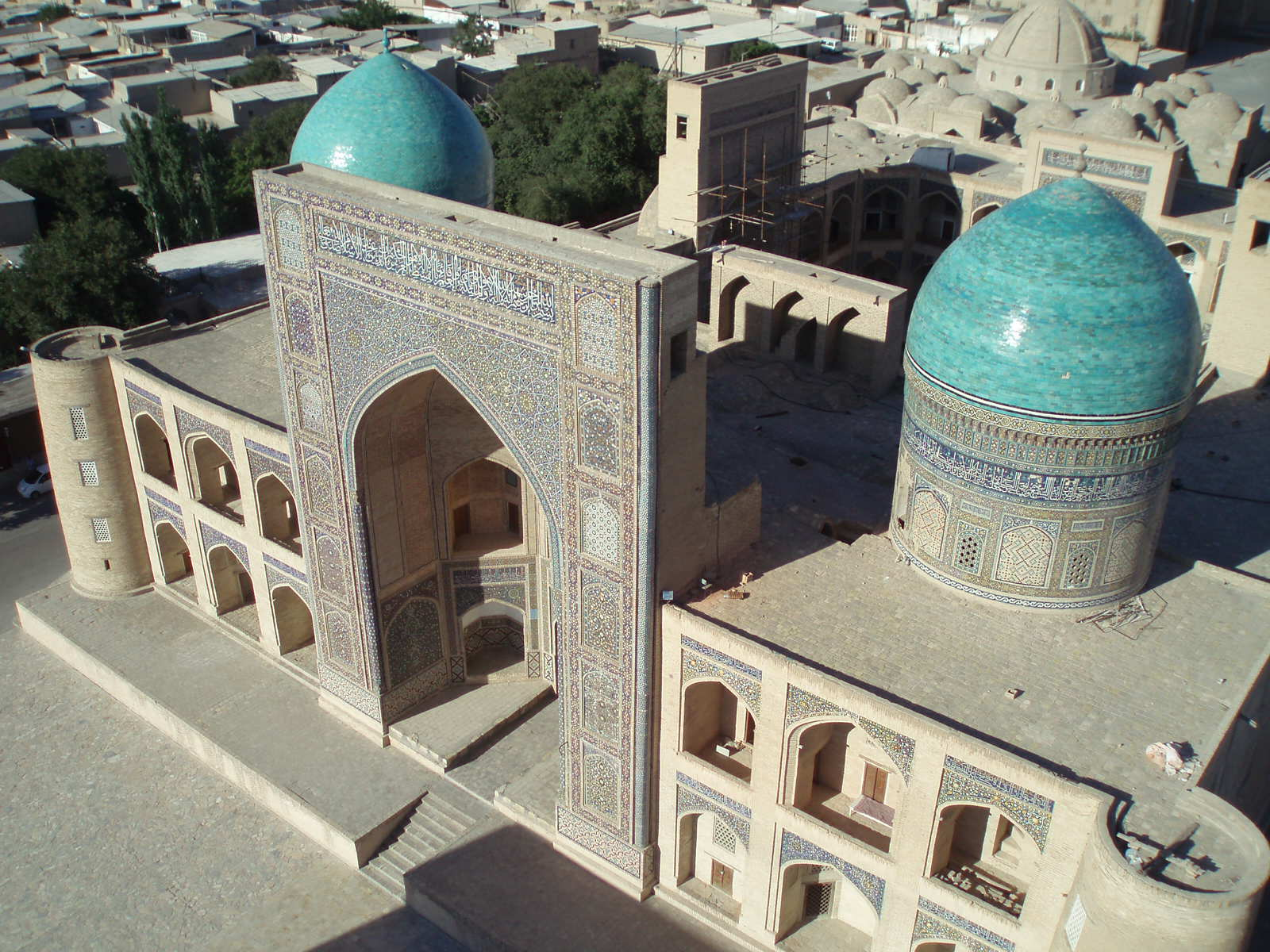
Mir-i 'Arab Madrasa in Bukhara, built under the Shaybanids in the early 16th century

Contemporary with the Safavids in Iran were other dynasties and ruling groups in Central Asia, such as the Shaybanids and other Uzbek tribal leaders. Monumental buildings continued to be built here, drawing on the traditional Timurid style. In Bukhara, the Shaybanids created the present Po-i-Kalyan complex, integrating the Qarakhanid-era Kalan Minaret, renovating the old mosque in 1514, and adding the large Mir-i 'Arab Madrasa (1535–6). Later, in Samarkand, the local ruler Yalangtush Bi Alchin gave the Registan its current appearance by building two new madrasas across from Ulugh Beg's madrasa. The Sherdar Madrasa (1616–1636) imitates the form of the Ulugh Beg Madrasa, while the Tilla Kar Madrasa (1646–1660) is both a mosque and a madrasa. Architectural activity became less significant in the region after the 17th century, with the exception of Khiva. The Friday mosque of Khiva, with its distinctive hypostyle hall of wooden columns, was rebuilt in this form in 1788–9.

==== Safavid Isfahan ====
Abbas I made Isfahan his capital and embarked on the most ambitious program of construction of the Safavid period. As a result, a very large proportion of preserved Safavid monuments are concentrated in this one city. Abbas I moved the political and economic center of the city from its traditional location near the old Jameh Mosque to a new area near the Zayandeh River to the south, where a new planned city was created. It includes a sprawling Grand Bazaar, lined with caravanserais, which opens via a monumental portal onto a vast, rectangular public square, the Maidan-e Shah or Naqsh-e Jahan, laid out between 1590 and 1602. The entire square is surrounded by a two-level arcade and symbolizes Abbas I's ambition to be one of the greatest sovereigns on the world stage. In addition to the bazaar's portal, three other buildings stand at the middle of each side of the square: the Sheikh Lotfollah Mosque (1603–1619), the Shah Mosque (1611–c. 1630), and the Ali Qapu, a palace gateway and pavilion begun c. 1597 and finished under Abbas II, c. 1660.

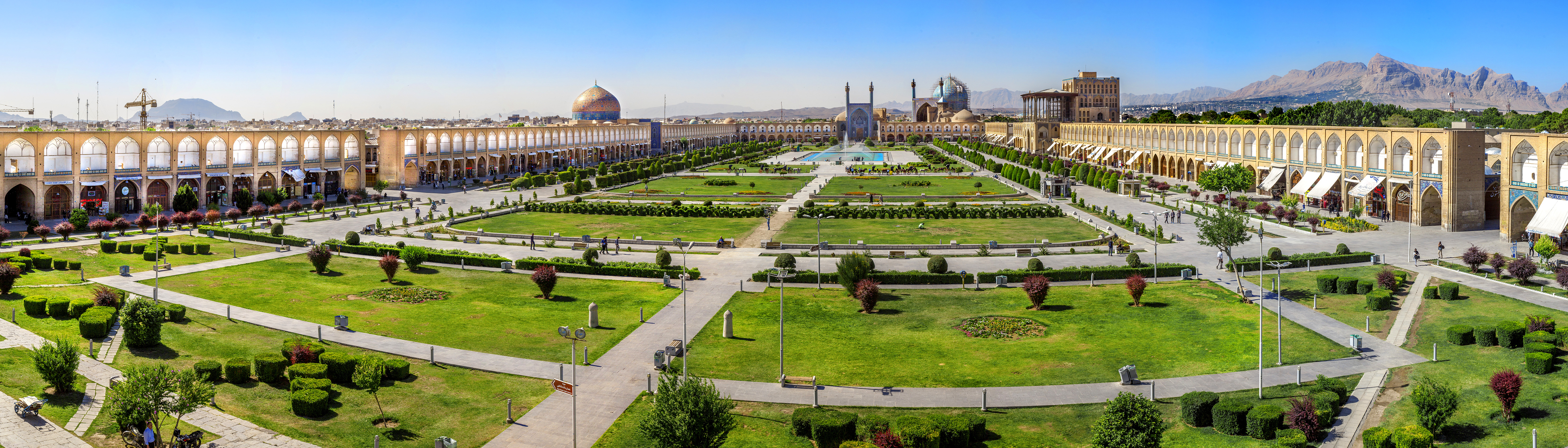
Naqsh-e Jahan Square in Isfahan is the epitome of Safavid-era architecture.

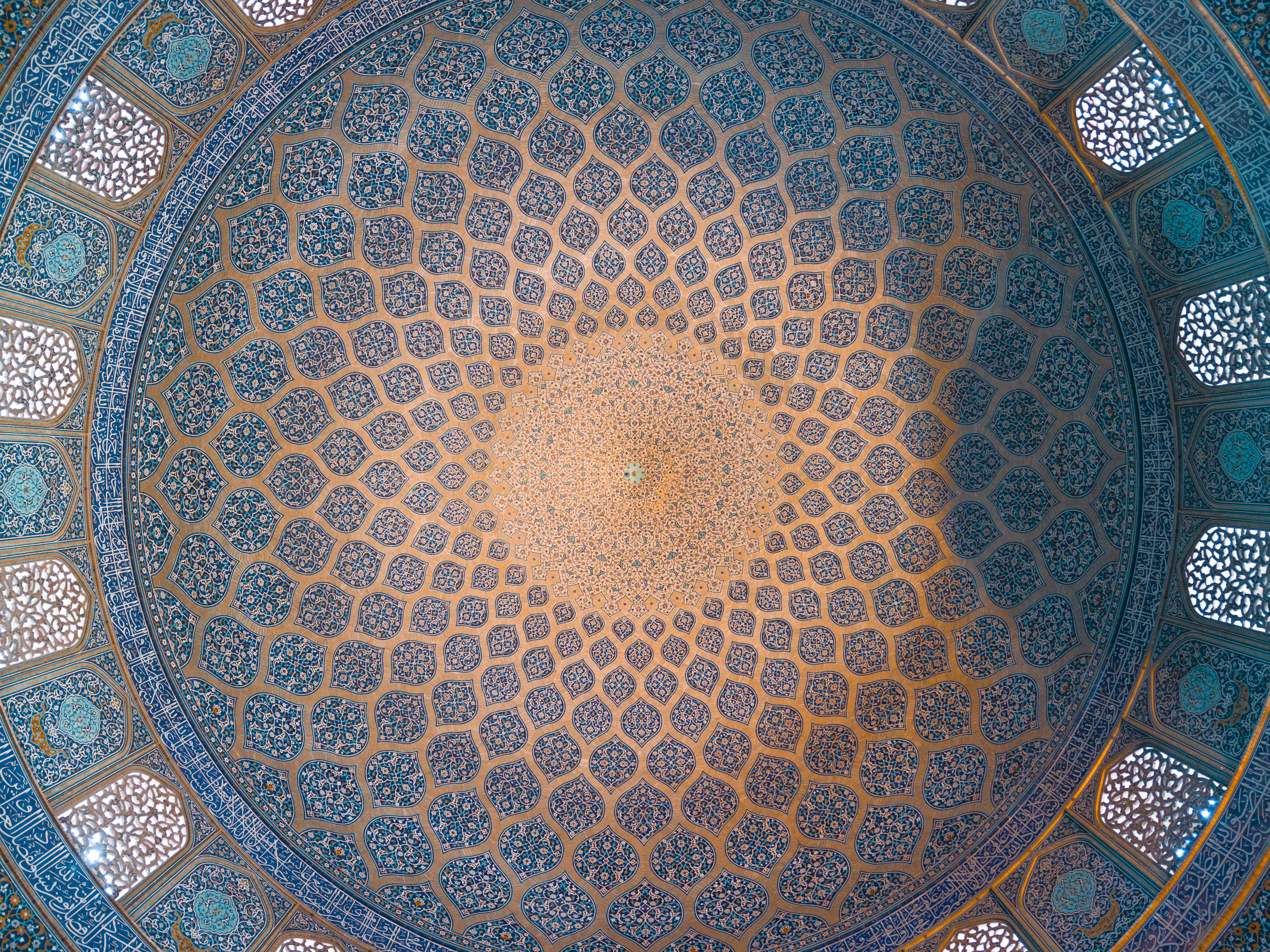
Interior of the dome of the Sheikh Lotfollah Mosque in Isfahan (1603–1619)

The two mosques on the square are each entered via monumental portals, but due to the difference between the direction of the qibla and the orientation of the square, both mosques are built at an angle from it and their vestibules bend on the way in. Both have prayer halls covered by a single large, double-shelled dome, though the Shah Mosque's prayer hall is also flanked by two hypostyle halls. Unlike in Timurid monuments, the dome interiors are not geometrically subdivided and have a uniform surface instead. An effect of lightness is achieved instead by the transitional zone of arches, squinches, and windows, with the walls of the prayer hall in the Shah Mosque also pierced by open archways. On the outside, the domes have an "onion" shape (i.e. bulging on the sides and pointed on top). While the Shah Mosque has minarets and a traditional central courtyard surrounded by four iwans, the Lutfallah Mosque has no minarets and is different from all other Safavid mosques by consisting only of the single domed chamber. The interiors of both mosques are entirely covered in glazed tiles, predominantly blue, which were restored in the 1930s on the basis of the few remaining original tiles.

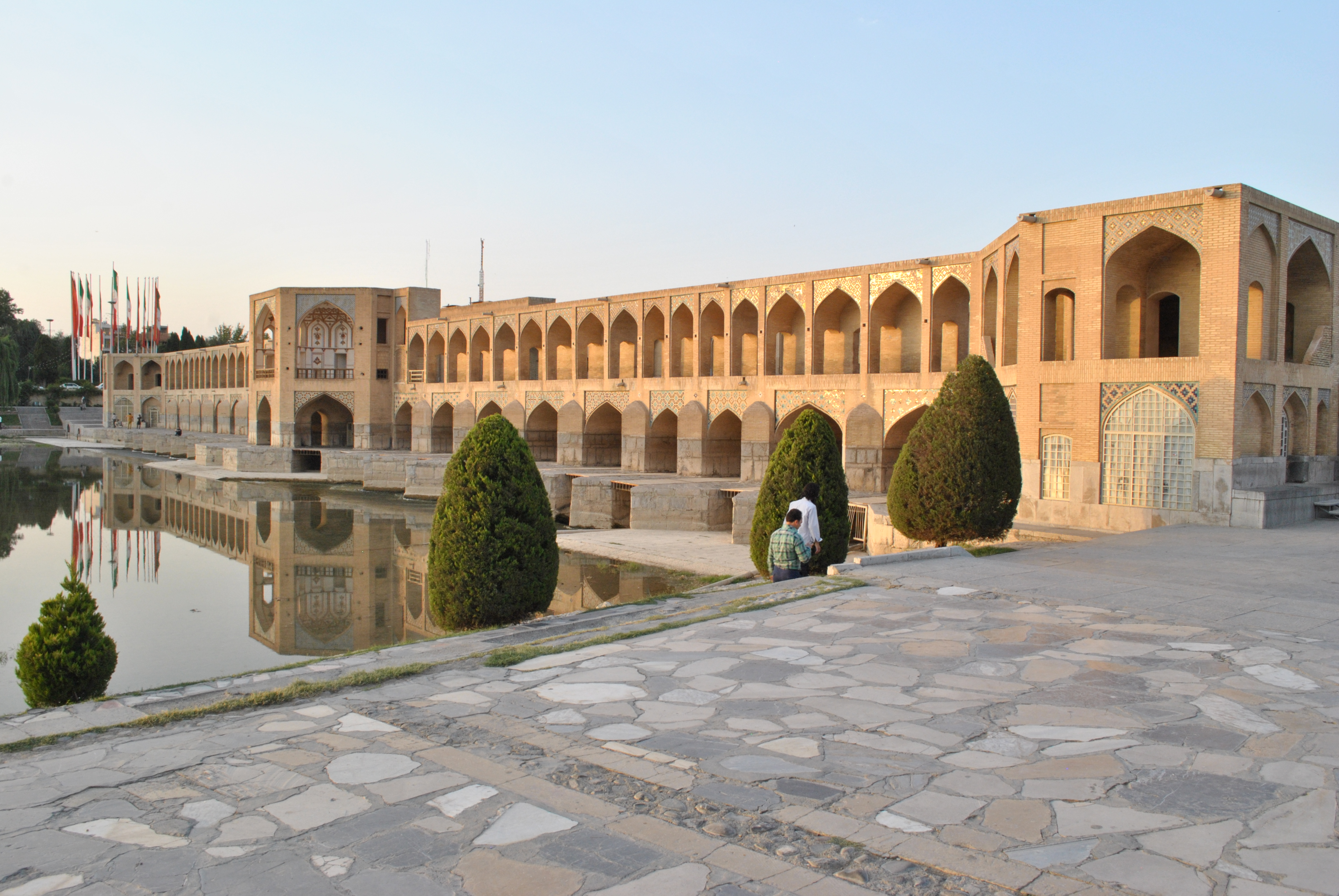
Khaju Bridge (1650) in Isfahan

To the west of the Maidan-i Shah square was a large palace complex of gardens and pavilions. The most important surviving pavilion, Chehel Sotoun ("Forty Columns"), is dated to 1647 by an inscription, but may have been established earlier. In 1706–7, a deep, broad porch with columns was added to it, giving it its present appearance. The other notable surviving pavilion, Hasht Behesht, mostly dates to the late 17th century. To the west of the palace grounds is a long, wide avenue called the Chaharbagh ("Four Gardens") which ends in the south at the Si-o-se-pol ("Bridge of thirty-three arches") bridge, built in 1602. The bridge is lined with arcades and features a wide central lane for caravans and beasts of burden as well as side passages for pedestrians. Further downstream, the Khaju Bridge (1650) is one of the finest monuments of the reign of Abbas II. Like the Si-o-se-pol, it combines aesthetic effect with practical function, but it is more complex and represents the apex of Safavid bridge design. It has two levels, each with a wide central passage for caravans and side passages for pedestrians along its flanking arches. At the middle of the bridge is a wider viewing pavilion with an octagonal layout.

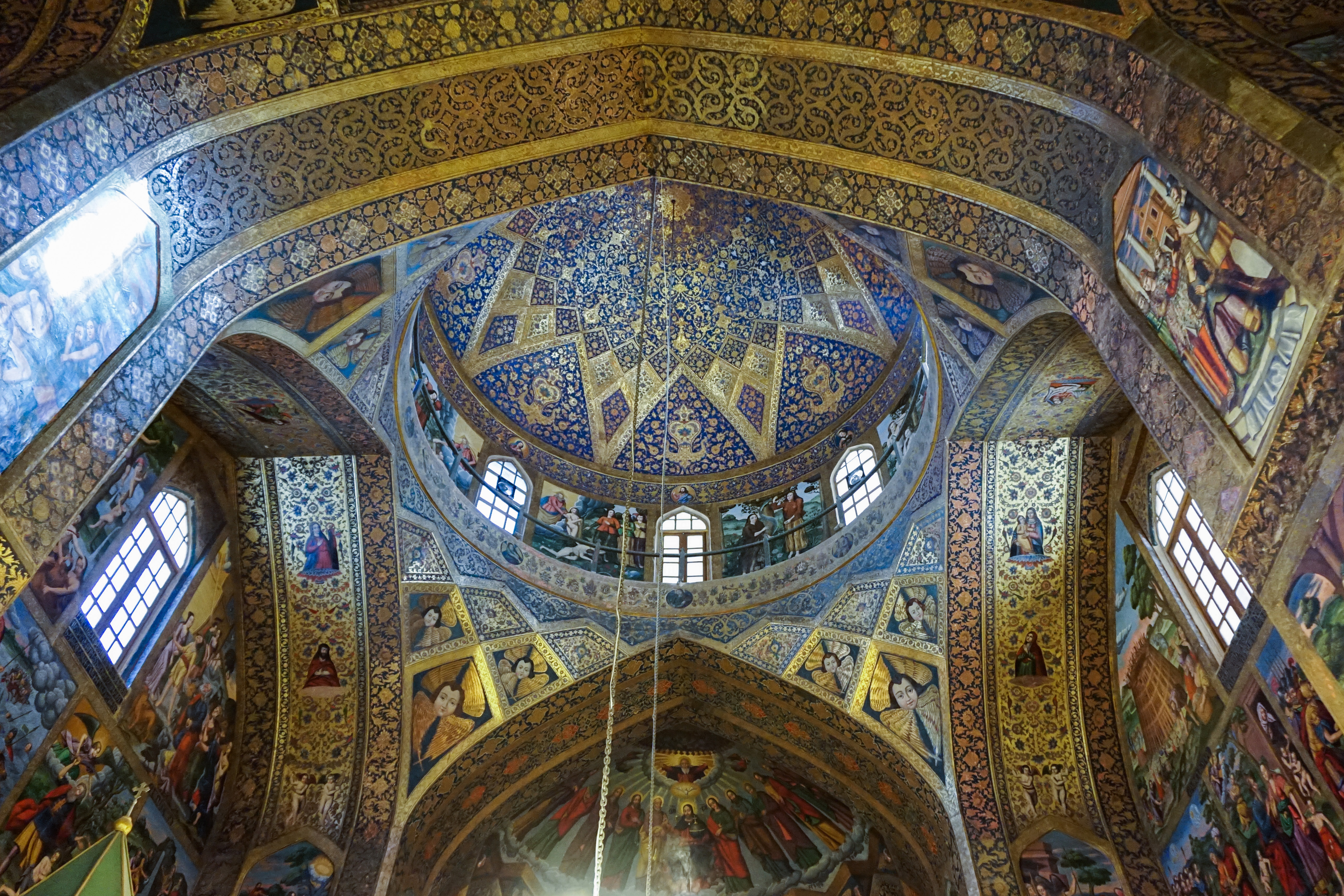
Interior of the Vank Cathedral in Isfahan (18th century)

These bridges connect the city centre with the south bank of the Zayandeh River, where royal Safavid hunting grounds were once located. After 1604, a Christian Armenian quarter, New Julfa, was also created here. Some 30 or so churches were built in the area, of which 13 survive today, dating to the 17th and early 18th centuries. The churches imported Armenian features and combined them with the contemporary Safavid style, as exemplified by the Vank Cathedral (or Holy Saviour Cathedral), dating in its current form to around 1656.

=== Zands and Qajars (18th–early 20th centuries) ===
As the Safavids declined in the 18th century, the Zand dynasty made Shiraz its capital. Karim Khan Zand, the dynasty's founder, created a grand square and built a new set of monuments, in a way similar to the Safavid construction projects in Isfahan, though on a smaller scale. Among the surviving monuments of this project is the Vakil Mosque, begun in 1766 and restored in 1827, as well as the Vakil Bazaar and the Vakil Bathhouse.

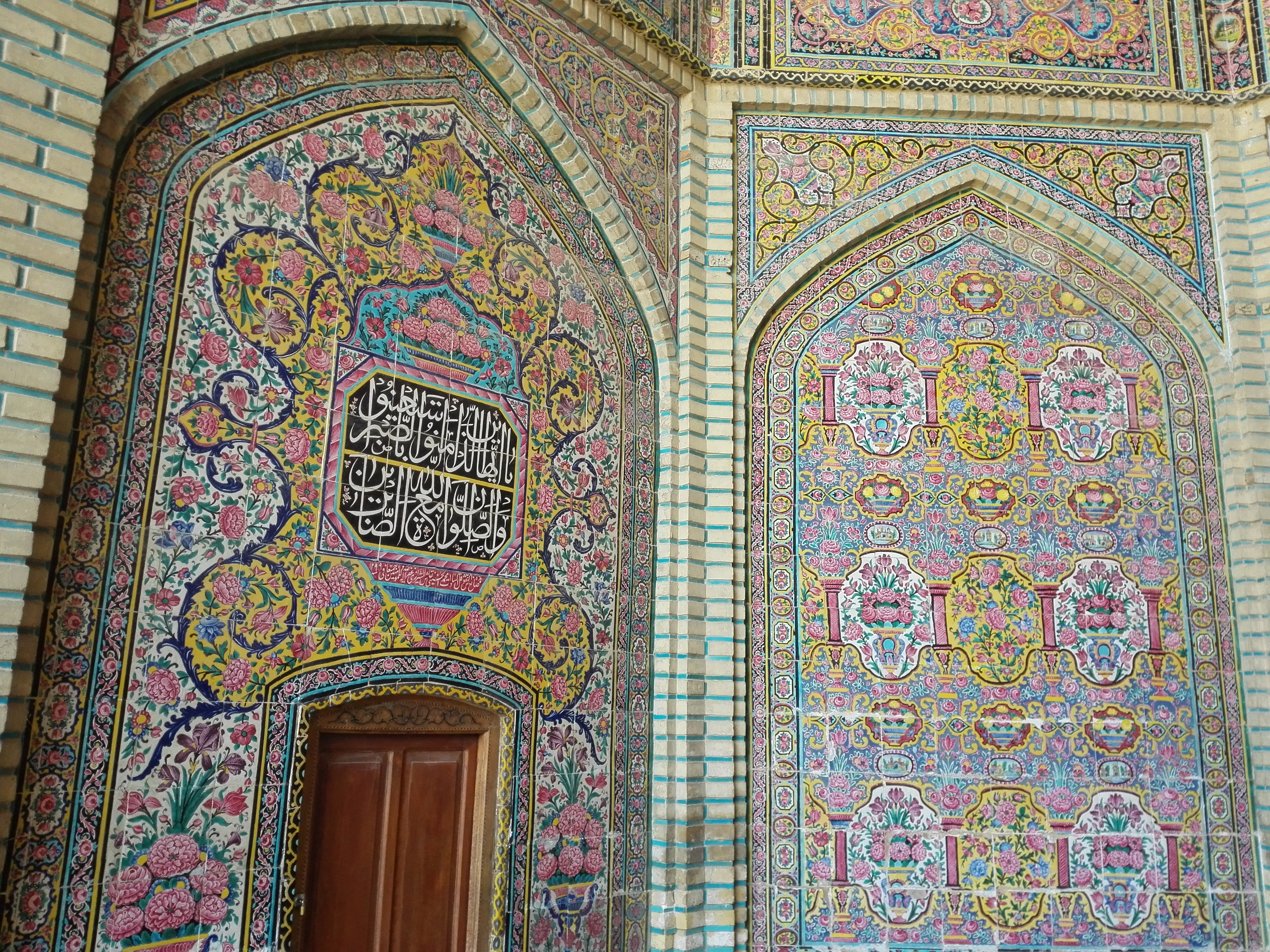
Painted tilework with images of flowers, at the Nasir-ol-Molk Mosque in Shiraz (1876–1888, Qajar period)

In northern Iran, the Qajars made their capital at Tehran. They continued to build mosques throughout the country with a traditional courtyard layout with four iwans, but with certain variations and the introduction of new features like clocktowers. The Qajars also expanded major shrines like the Imam Reza Shrine in Mashhad and the Fatima Masumeh Shrine in Qom. In Shiraz (which came under Qajar rule in 1794), the Nasir-ol-Molk Mosque (1876–1888) has a traditional layout but exemplifies a new style of decorative tiles, painted in overglaze with images of flower bouquets in predominantly blue, pink, yellow, violet and green colors, sometimes on a white background. This type of tile decoration can also be seen at the Sepahsalar Mosque in Tehran (1881–1890).

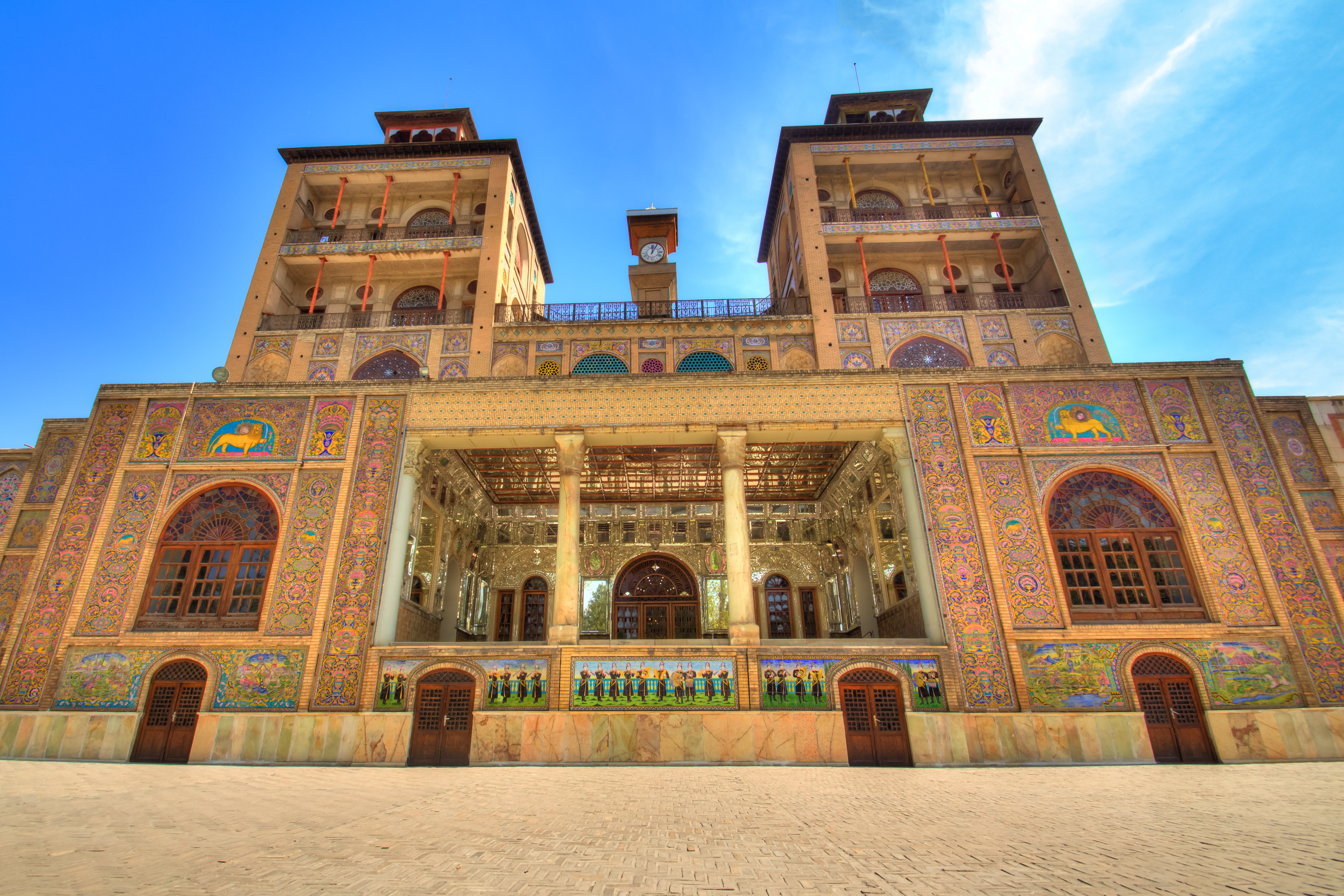
The Shams-ol-Emareh in the Golestan Palace of Tehran, added by Naser al-Din Shah (r. 1848–1896)

Of the Qajar palaces built in and around Tehran, the most famous is the Golestan Palace, which was both the administrative center and the shah's winter residence. Used by successive Qajar rulers, the palace underwent many modifications that illustrate the progressive changes over this period. Traditional forms were still prevalent under Fath Ali Shah (r. 1797–1834), who commissioned the Marble Throne and installed it in a traditional audience hall fronted by columns. The 19th century also saw the rise of revivalist trends. Qajar monarchs, including Fath Ali Shah, commissioned works that deliberately referenced Safavid and ancient Sasanian architecture, hoping to appropriate their symbolism of kingship and empire.

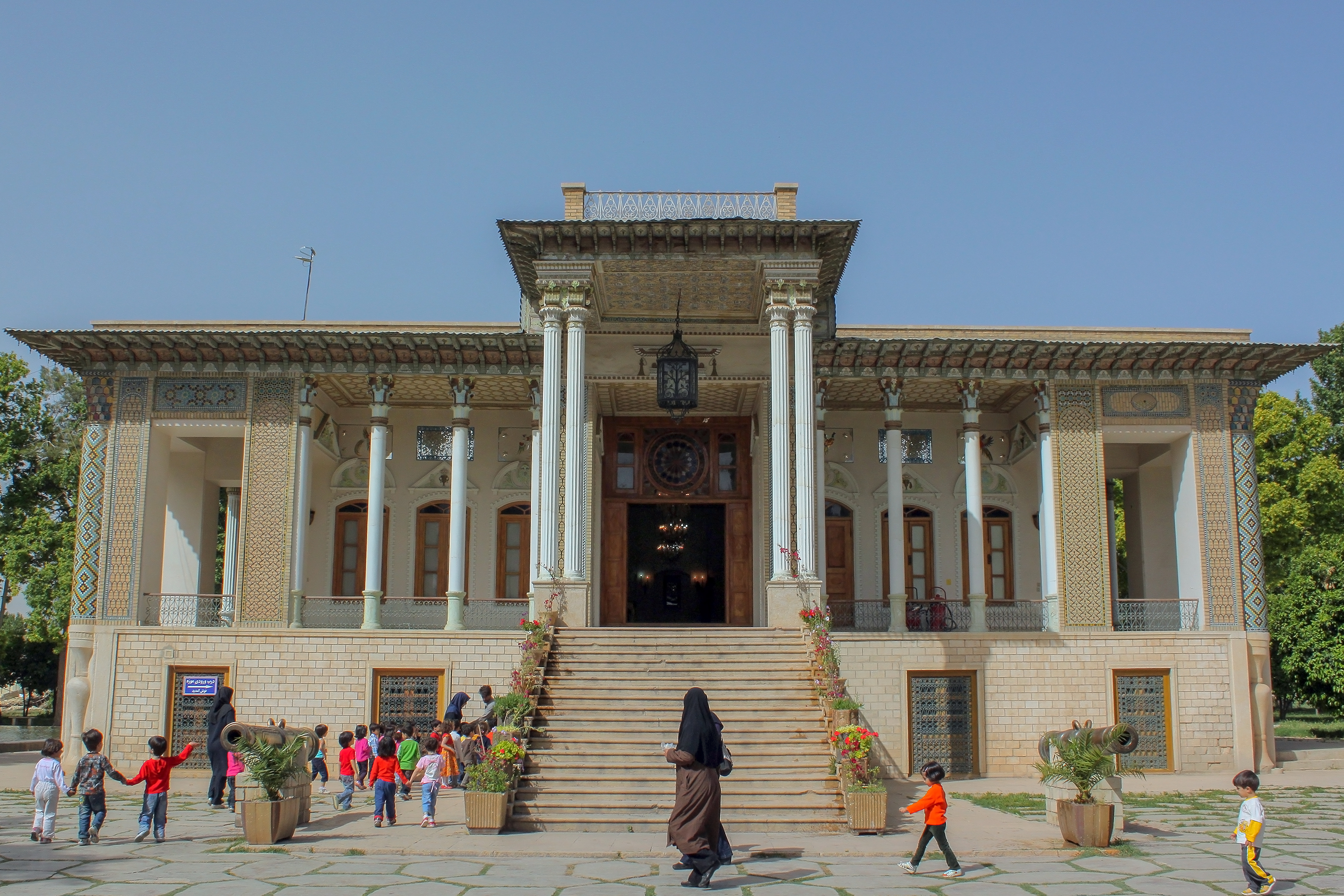
Afif-Abad Garden (1863–1867) in Shiraz is an example of Achaemenid and Sasanian revivalism

Under Naser al-Din Shah (r. 1848–1896), new elements and styles of European inspiration began to be introduced, such as tall windows, pilasters, and formal staircases. At the Golestan Palace, he added the Shams ol-Emareh, a tall multi-leveled structure with two towers. He also remodelled Tehran, demolishing the dense urban fabric in parts of the old city, as well as its historic walls, and replacing them with boulevards and open squares inspired by what he saw in his visits to Europe.

At the beginning of the 20th century, during the last decades of the Qajar era and the early years of the Pahlavi era, revivalist trends continued to be popular and were employed in the design of both public and private buildings, including those commissioned by the rising bourgeoisie. This resulted in many examples of buildings across the country with an eclectic blend of stylistic features from both the Islamic and ancient Zoroastrian eras.

== Persian domes ==
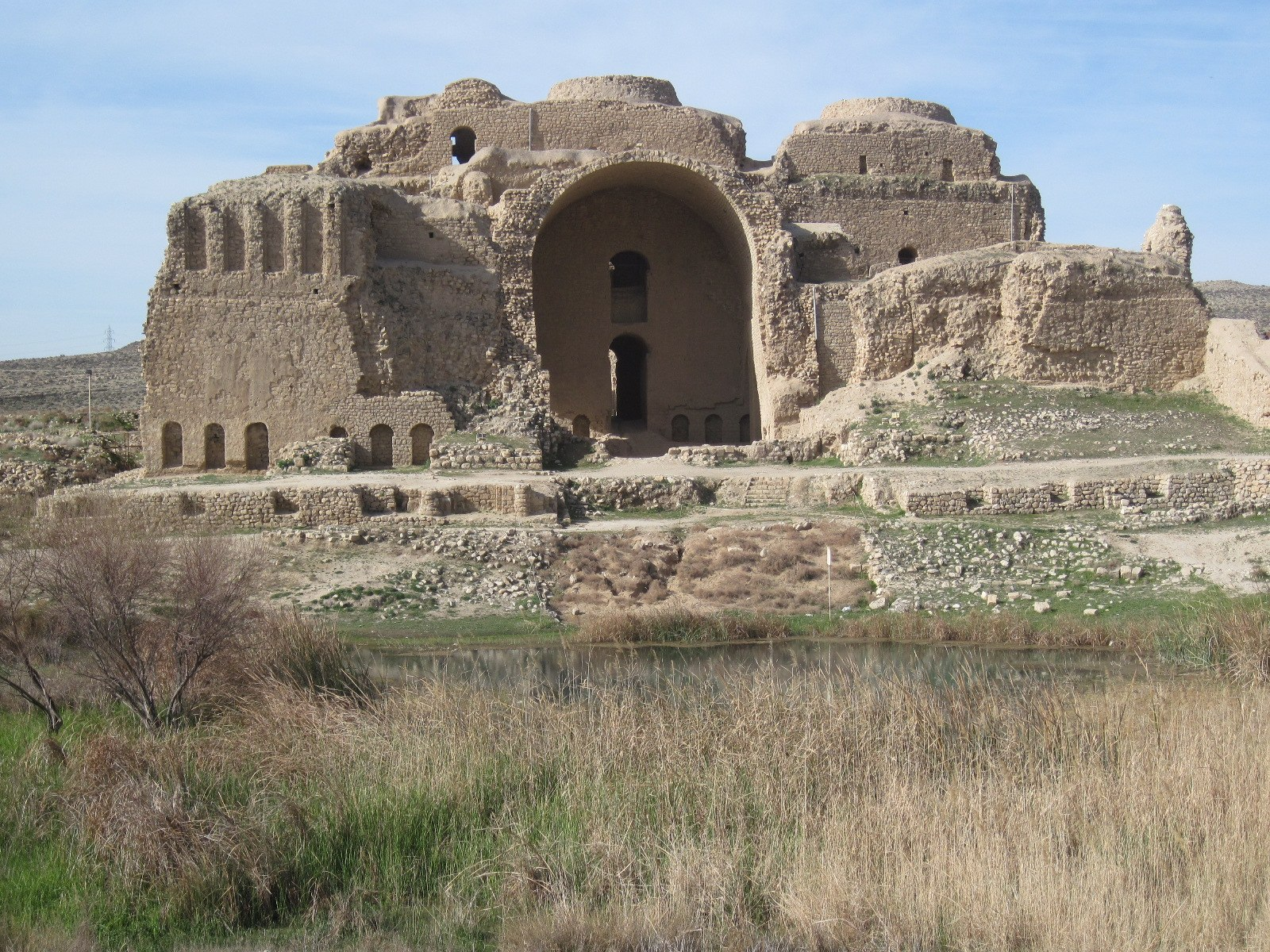
The Palace of Ardashir, constructed in 224 during the Sasanian era. The building has three large domes, among the oldest examples of such large-scale domes in the world.

The Sasanian Empire initiated the construction of the first large-scale domes in Iran, with such royal buildings as the Palace of Ardashir and Qal'eh Dokhtar. After the Muslim conquest of the Sassanid Empire, the Persian architectural style became a major influence on Islamic societies and the dome also became a feature of Muslim architecture.

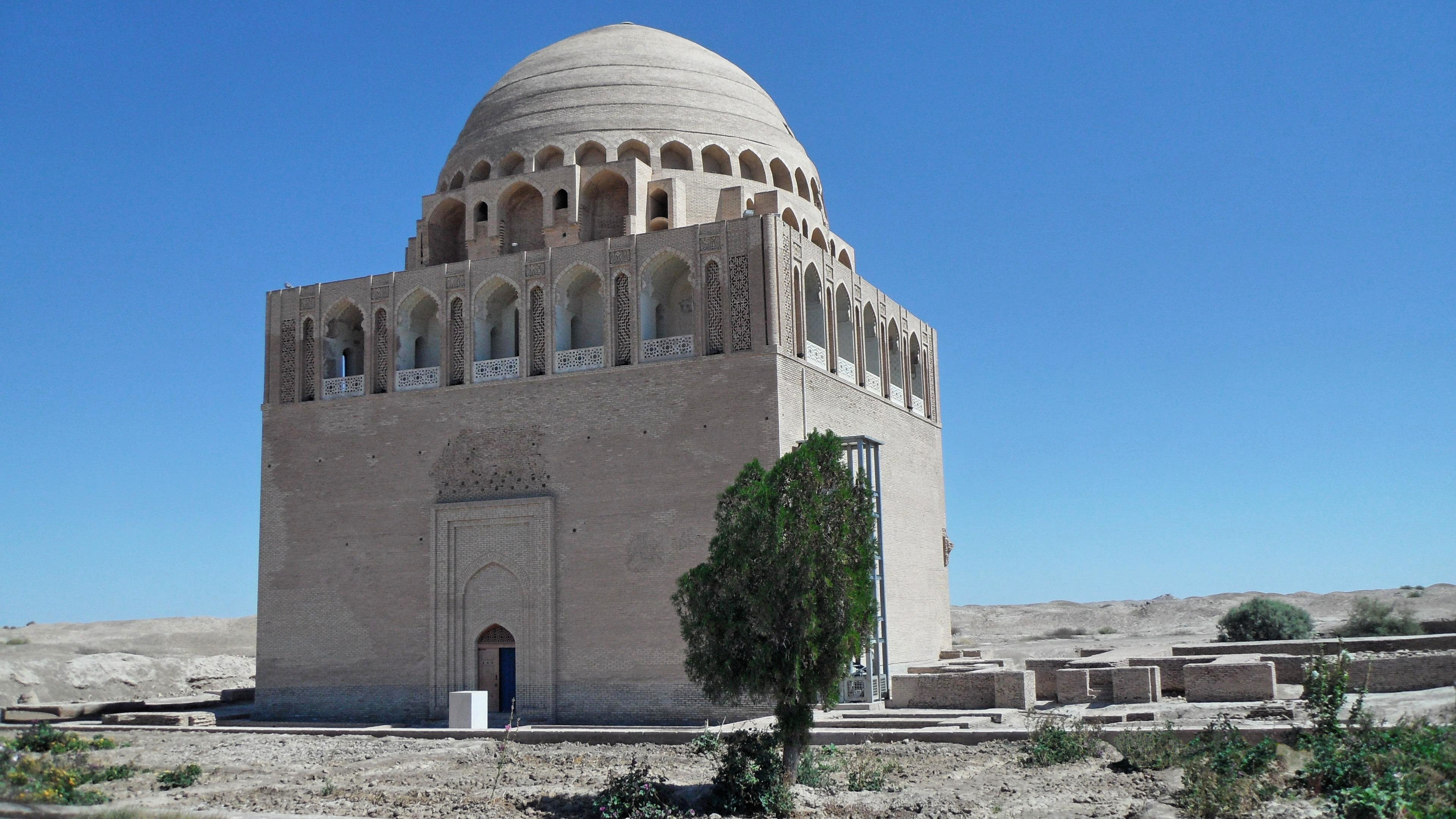
The tomb of Seljuq sultan Ahmad Sanjar in Merv, Turkmenistan. The medieval structure with a typical Persian dome is a fine example of the Seljuq-period Persian architecture.

The Il-Khanate period provided several innovations to dome-building that eventually enabled the Persians to construct much taller structures. These changes later paved the way for Safavid architecture. The pinnacle of Il-Khanate architecture was reached with the construction of the Dome of Soltaniyeh (1302–1312) in Zanjan, Iran, which measures 50 m in height and 25 m in diameter, making it the 3rd largest and the tallest masonry dome ever erected. The thin, double-shelled dome was reinforced by arches between the layers.

The renaissance in Persian mosque and dome building came during the Safavid era, when Abbas the Great, in 1598, initiated the reconstruction of Isfahan, with the Naqsh-e Jahan Square as the centerpiece of his new capital. Architecturally they borrowed heavily from Il-Khanate designs, but artistically they elevated the designs to a new level.

The distinct feature of Persian domes, which separates them from those domes created in the Christian world or the Ottoman and Mughal empires, was the use of colourful tiles, with which the exterior of domes are covered much like the interior. These domes soon numbered dozens in Isfahan and the distinct blue shape would dominate the skyline of the city. Reflecting the light of the sun, these domes appeared like glittering turquoise gems and could be seen from miles away by travelers following the Silk road through Persia.

This very distinct style of architecture was inherited from the Seljuk era, who for centuries had used it in their mosque building, but it was perfected during the Safavids when they invented the haft-rang, or seven colour style of tile burning, a process that enabled them to apply more colours to each tile, creating richer patterns, sweeter to the eye. The colours that the Persians favoured were gold, white and turquoise patterns on a dark-blue background. The extensive inscription bands of calligraphy and arabesque on most of the major buildings where carefully planned and executed by Ali Reza Abbasi, who was appointed head of the royal library and Master calligrapher at the Shah's court in 1598, while Shaykh Bahai oversaw the construction projects. Reaching 53 meters in height, the dome of Masjed-e Shah (Shah Mosque) would become the tallest in the city when it was finished in 1629. It was built as a double-shelled dome, spanning 14 m between the two layers and resting on an octagonal dome chamber.

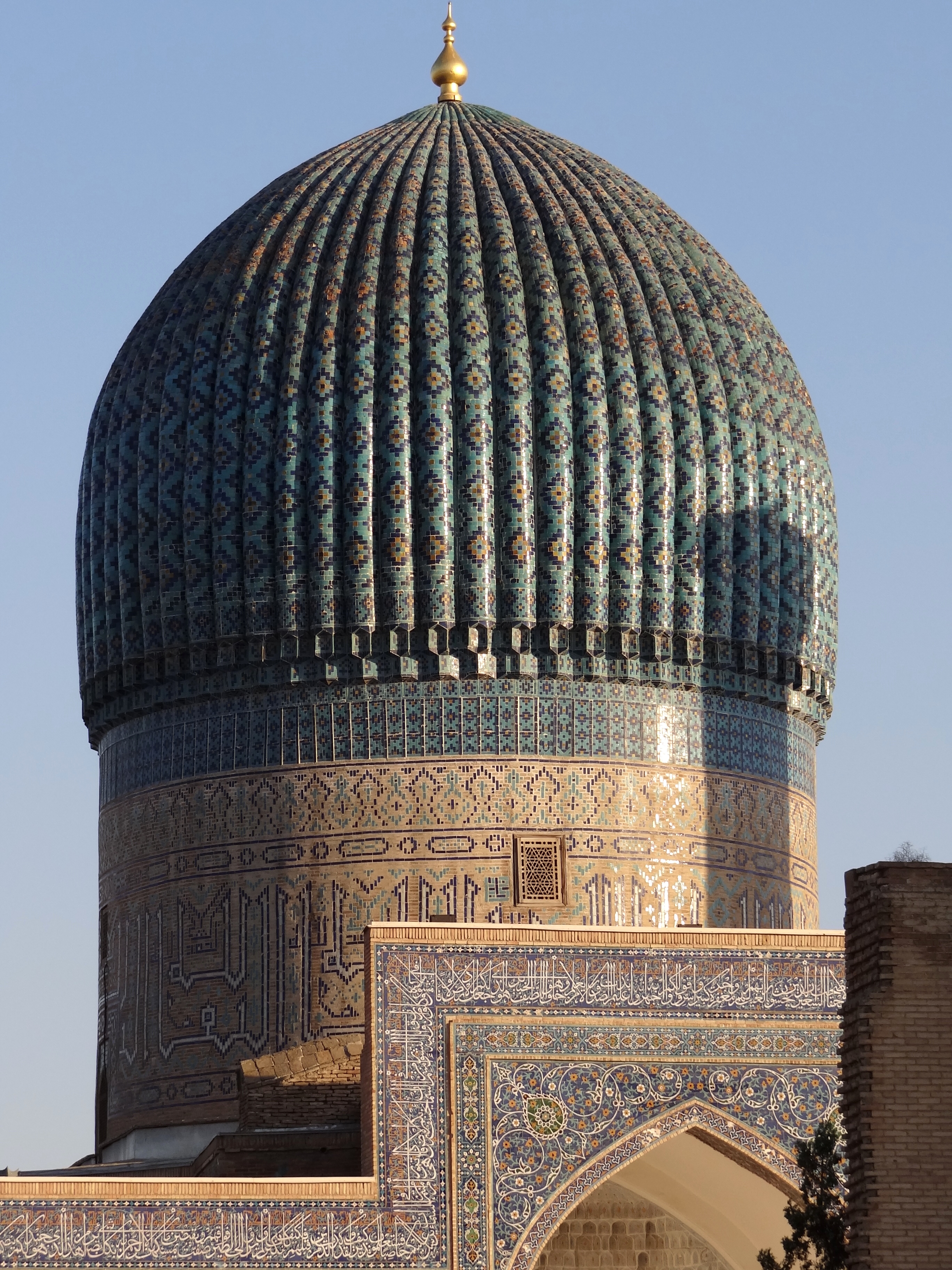
Dome of Gur-e Amir Mausoleum in Samakand (early 14th century)

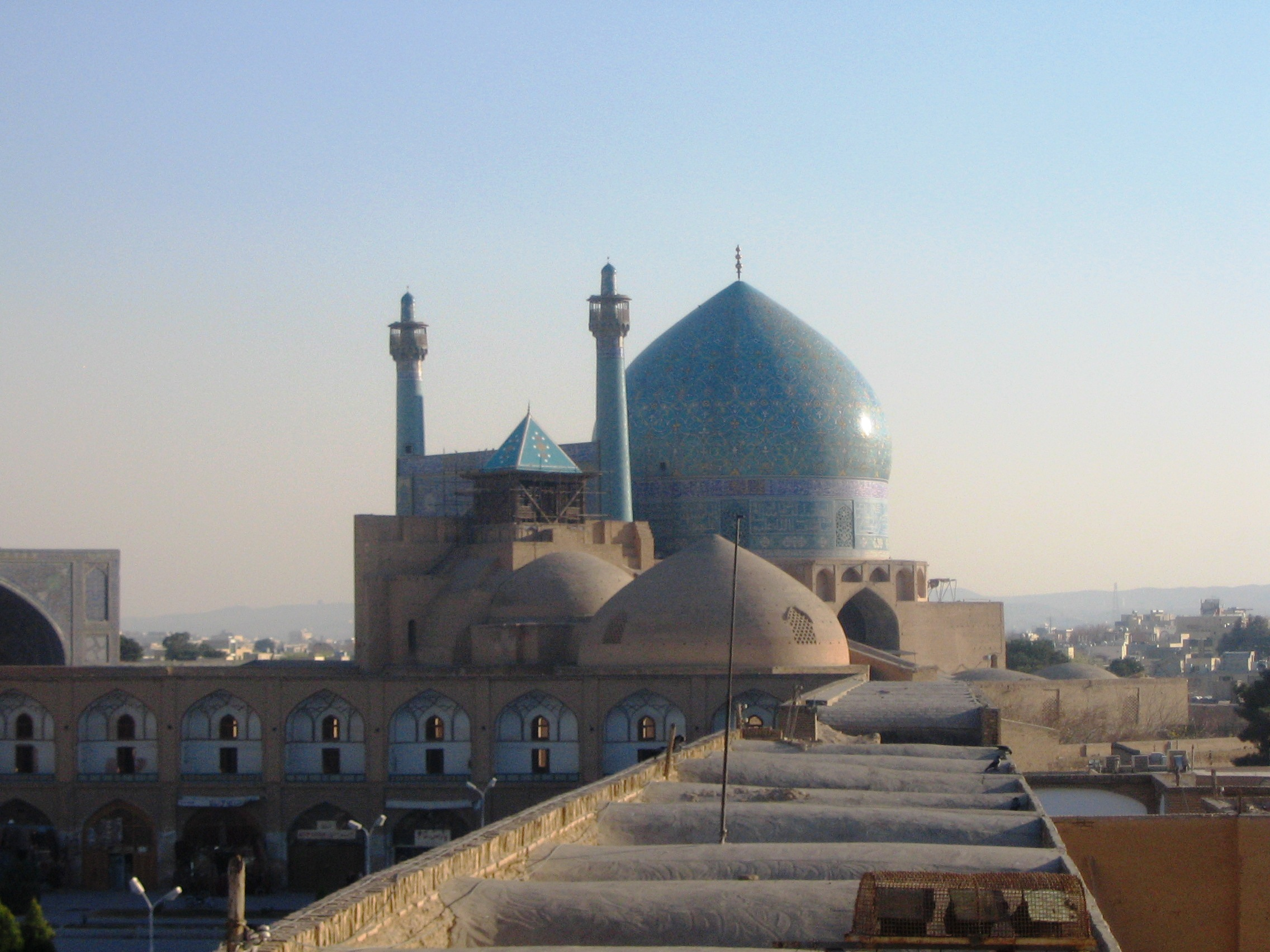
Example of a common shape of Persian dome at the Shah Mosque in Isfahan (early 17th century)

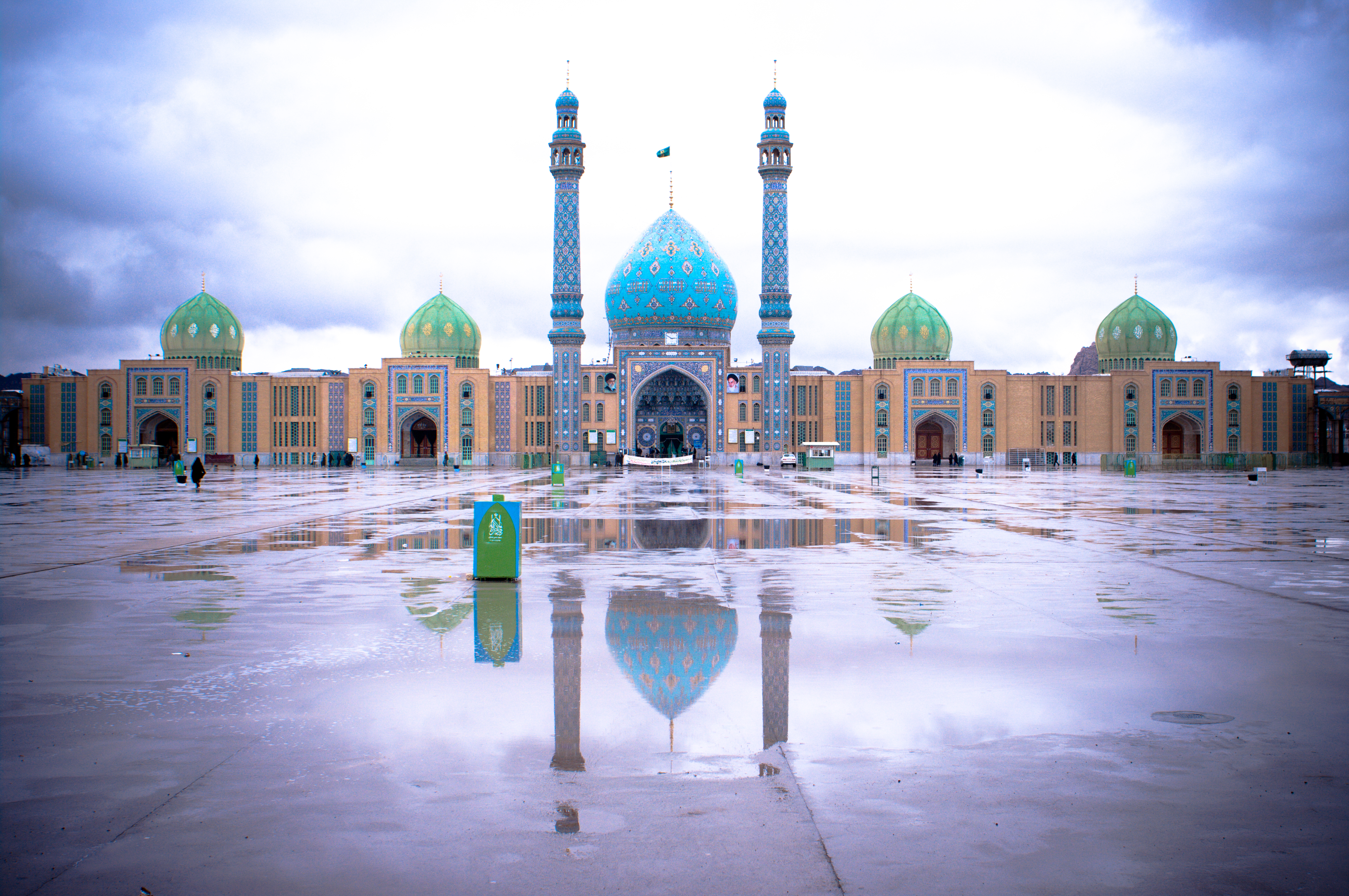
Jamkaran Mosque, near Qom (21st century)

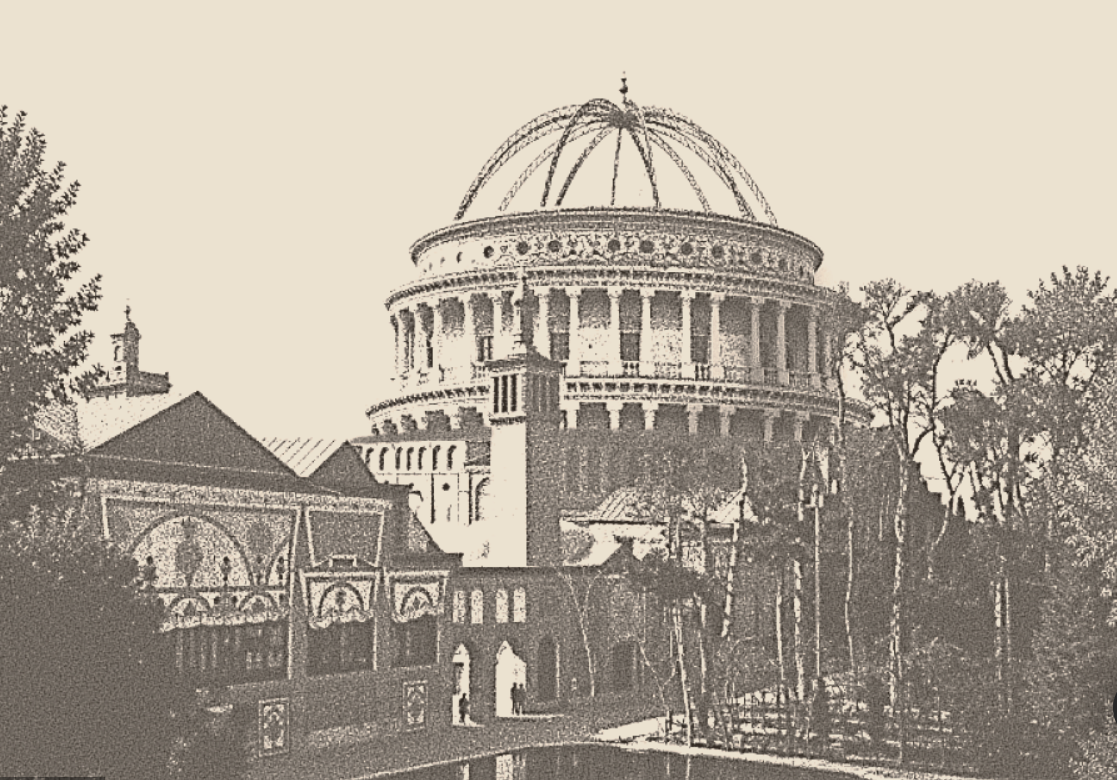
A dome and rotunda of the Qajar era, at Takyeh Dowlat, Tehran (19th century)

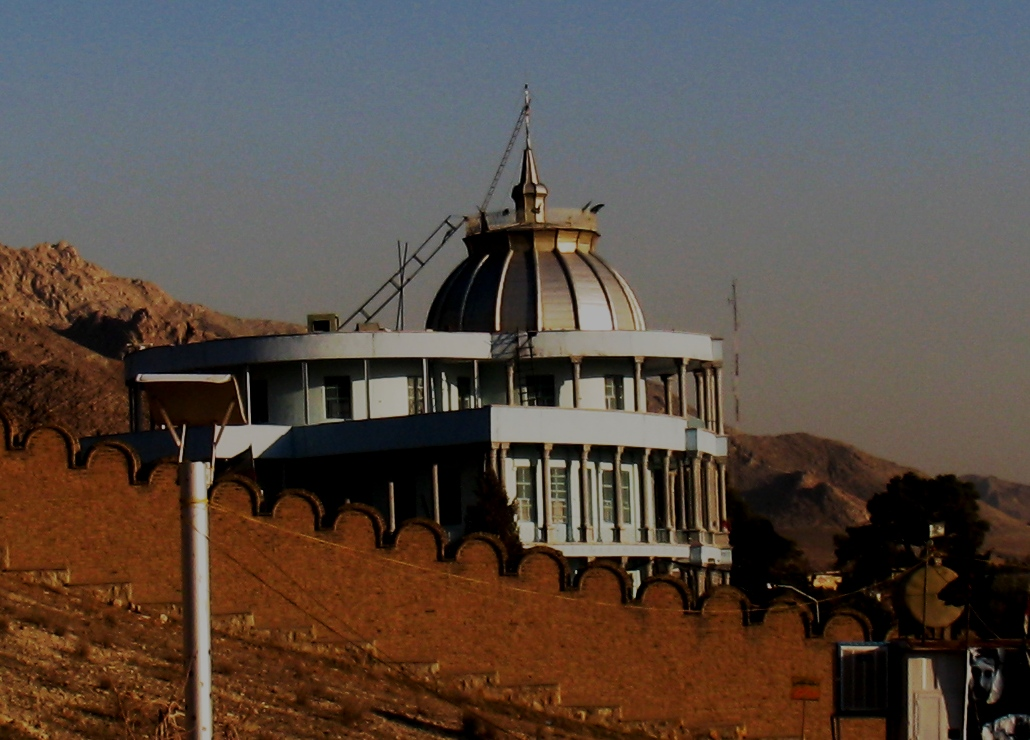
The dome of Farahabad Palace in Tehran (19th century)

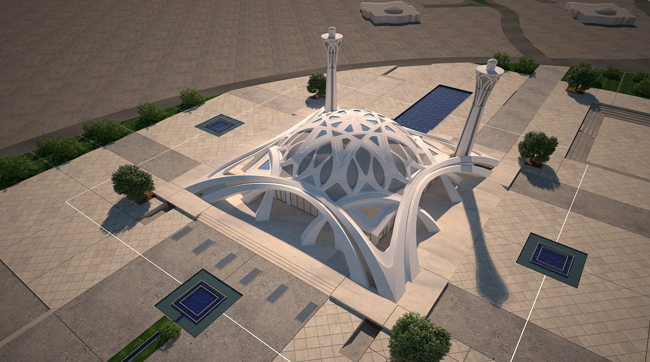
Modern dome architecture in the proposed mosque of Isfahan international convention center

== Contemporary Iranian architecture ==
Contemporary architecture in Iran begins with the advent of the first Pahlavi period in the early 1920s. Some designers, such as Andre Godard, created works such as the National Museum of Iran that were reminiscent of Iran's historical architectural heritage. Others made an effort to merge the traditional elements with modern designs in their works. The Tehran University main campus is one such example. Others, such as Heydar Ghiai and Houshang Seyhoun, have tried to create completely original works, independent of prior influences. Dariush Borbor's architecture successfully combined modern architecture with local vernacular. The Azadi Tower, originally called the Shadyad Tower, was completed in 1971 and has since become one of the major landmarks of Tehran. Designed by Hossein Amanat, it incorporates forms and ideas from historic Iranian architecture. Milad Tower (or Milad Tower), completed in 2007, is the tallest tower in Iran and is the 24th tallest free-standing structure in the world.

Modern Iranian architecture is also notable for its use of brickwork for functional and aesthetic purposes, adapted to the arid climate of Iran and informed by Iran's vernacular architecture and traditional brickwork techniques.

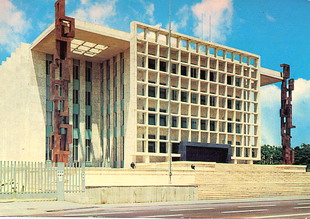
Iran Senate House Traditional Persian mythology such as the chains of justice of Nowshiravan and essences of Iranian architecture have been incorporated by Heydar Ghiai to create a new modern Iranian architecture.

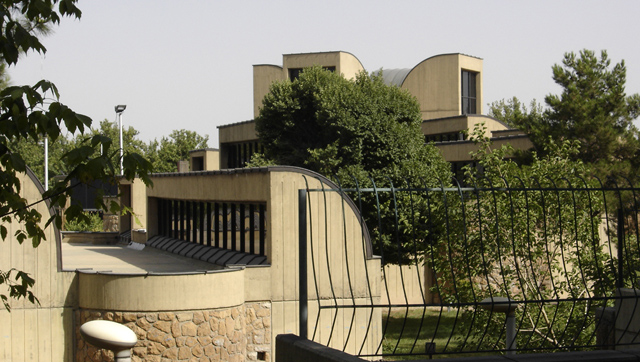
Tehran's Museum of Contemporary Arts designed by Kamran Diba is based on traditional Iranian elements such as Badgirs, and yet has a spiraling interior reminiscent of Frank Lloyd Wright's Guggenheim.

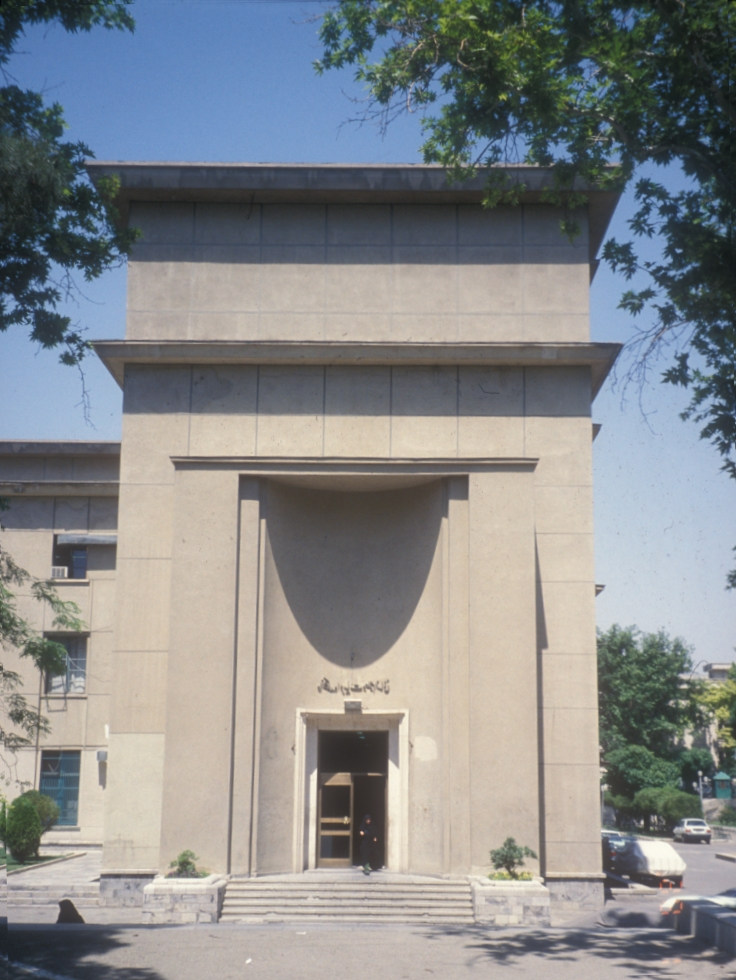
Tehran University College of Social Sciences shows obvious traces of architecture from Persepolis.

== Iranian architects ==
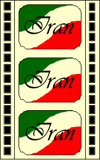
Click here for animation of Iranian architecture.

The first professional association of Iranian architects, the Society of Iranian Diplomate Architects, was founded on 30 January 1945. Its founders were Iranian architects, including Vartan Avanessian, Mohsen Foroughi, and Keyghobad Zafar. Foreign architects had been very prominent in Iran during the early 20th century, and one of the new association's activities was the publication of a magazine, Architecte, which promoted Iranian architects. In 1966, a new professional association was founded, the Association of Iranian Architects. Its founders included Vartan Avanessian, Abass Azhdari, Naser Badi, Abdelhamid Eshraq, Manuchehr Khorsandi, Iraj Moshiri, Ali Sadeq, and Keyghobad Zafar.

Several Iranian architects have managed to win the prestigious A' Design Award 2018 in an unprecedented number of sections. A number of Iranian architects have also won the Aga Khan Award for Architecture, including:

- Bagh-e-Ferdowsi, Tehran. 1999–2001
- New Life for Old Structures, Various locations. 1999–2001
- Shushtar New Town, Shushtar. 1984–1986
- Ali Qapu, Chehel Sutun, and Hasht Behesht, Isfahan. 1978–1980

== UNESCO designated World Heritage Sites ==
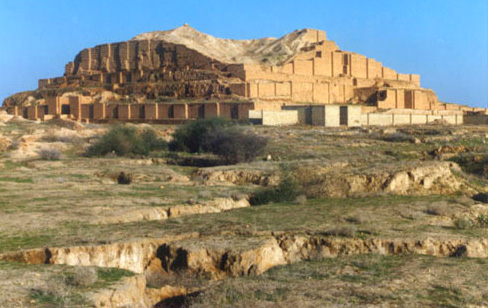
Ziggurats such as the UNESCO designated World Heritage Site of Chogha Zanbil, which relieved the flat monotony of the southern Khuzestan plane, were but "ritual imitations of the familiar sacred mountains which ring the Iranian plateau".

The following is a list of World Heritage Sites designed or constructed by Iranians, or designed and constructed in the style of Iranian architecture:

- Inside Iran:
  - Arg-e Bam Cultural Landscape, Kerman
  - Naqsh-e Jahan Square, Isfahan
  - Pasargadae, Fars
  - Persepolis, Fars
  - Chogha Zanbil, Khuzestan
  - Takht-e Soleyman, West Azerbaijan
  - Dome of Soltaniyeh, Zanjan
  - Behistun Inscription, Kermanshah province
- Outside Iran:
  - Mausoleum of Sultan Sanjar, Turkmenistan
  - Ruins of Konye-Urgench, Turkmenistan
  - Mausoleum of Khoja Ahmed Yasavi, Kazakhstan
  - Historic Centre of Baku, Azerbaijan
  - Historic Centre of Ganja, Azerbaijan
  - Historic Centre of Bukhara, Uzbekistan
  - Historic Centre of Shahrisabz, Uzbekistan
  - Itchan Kala of Khiva, Uzbekistan
  - Samarkand, Uzbekistan
  - Citadel, Ancient City and Fortress Buildings of Derbent, Daghestan, Russia
  - Baha'i Gardens, Haifa, Israel
  - Bibi-Heybat Mosque, Azerbaijan
  - Tuba Shahi Mosque, Azerbaijan
  - Palace of Shaki Khans, Shaki, Azerbaijan

== See also ==
- Yakhchāl
- Ab anbar
- Windcatcher
- Great Wall of Gorgan
- Band-e Kaisar
- Construction industry of Iran
- Architecture of Azerbaijan
- Mughal architecture
- ArchNet, MIT/UT Austin's archive of Iranian architectural documents
