= 1943–44 Iranian legislative election =

Iranian legislative election, 1943–1944
- November 1943/February 1944

All 136 seats to the National Consultative Assembly
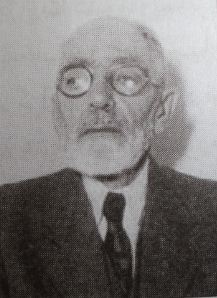

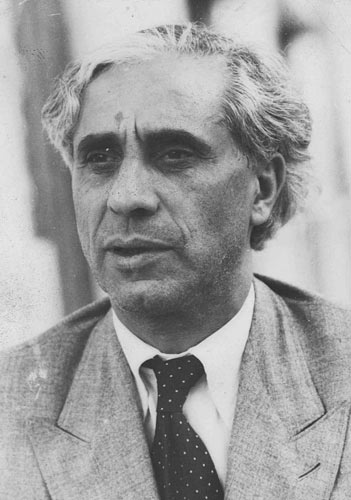

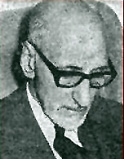

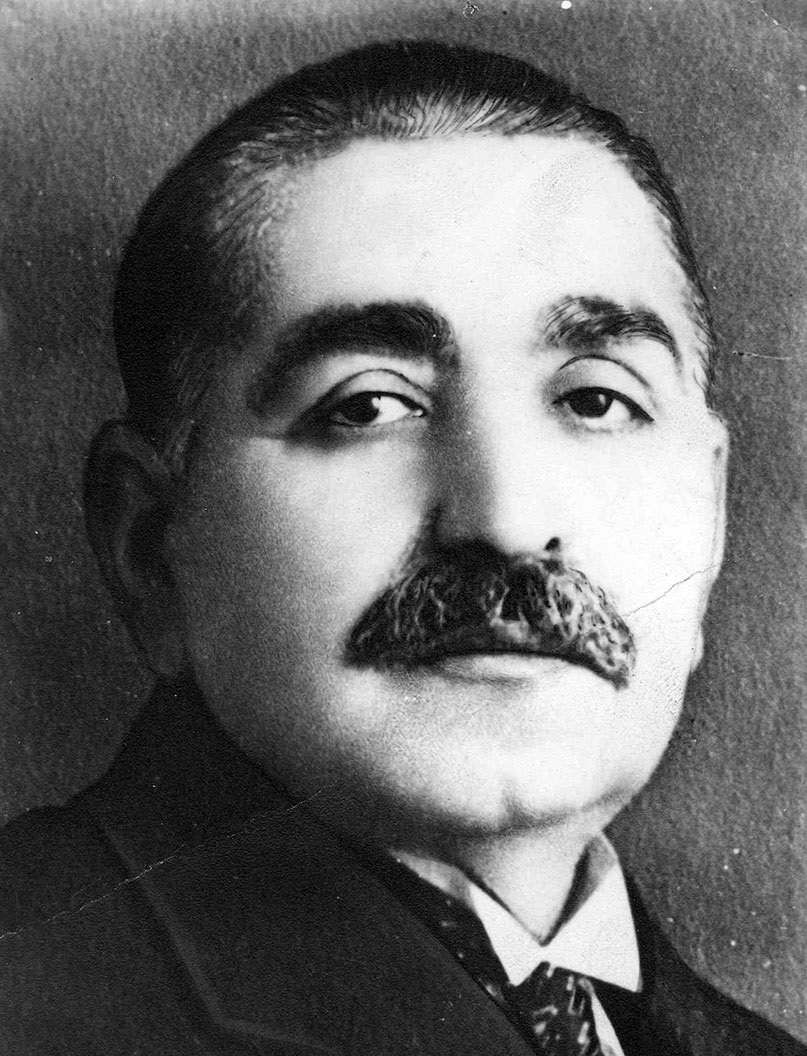

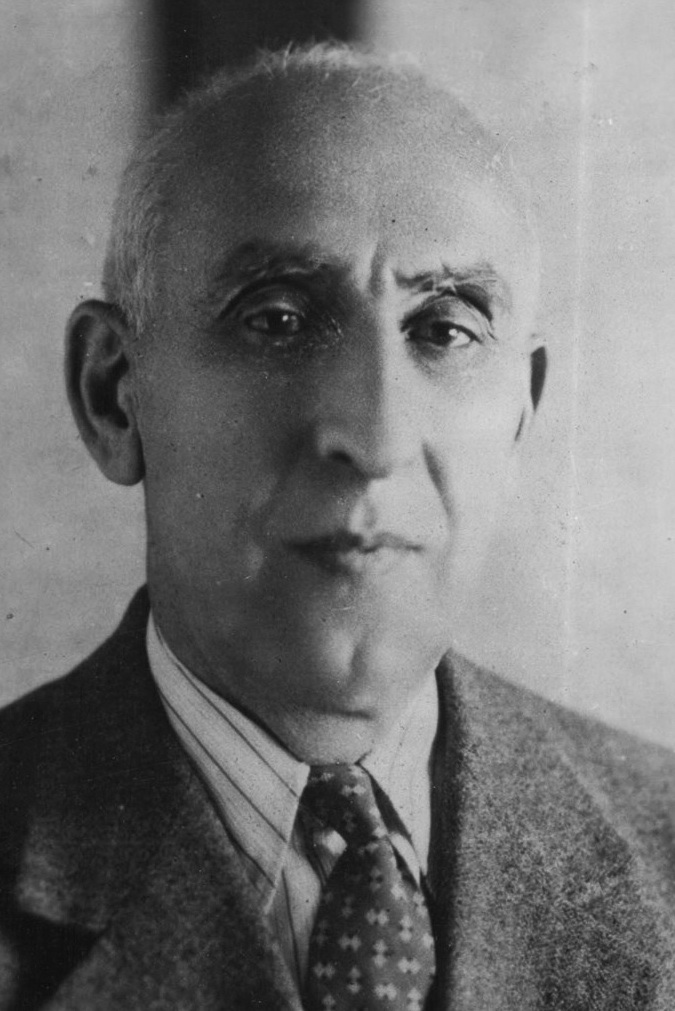

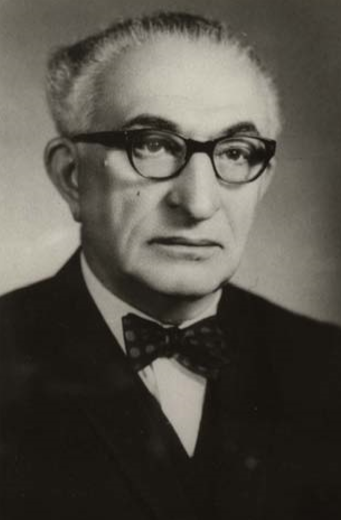

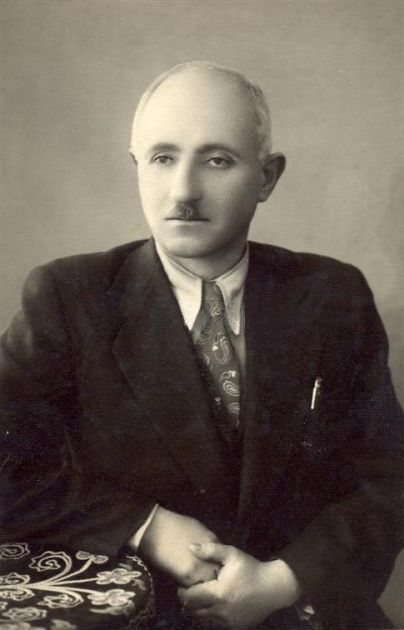

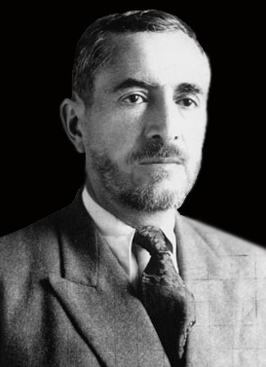
	First party	Second party	Third party
Leader	Sadegh Tabatabai	Ziaeddin Tabatabai	Ali Dashti
Party	National Union Party	National Will Party	Justice Party
Leader's seat	Tehran	Yazd	Tehran
Seats won	30	26	15
	Fourth party	Fifth party	Sixth party
Leader	Mehdi Farrokh	Soleiman Eskandari	Mohammad Mosaddegh (Note: Mosaddegh took pride of being an Independent politician at the time and was not a member of Iran Party. However his views often coincided with the party which campaigned on his behalf.)
Party	Tribal unions	Tudeh Party	Iran Party
Leader's seat	Zabol	Did not stand	Tehran
Seats won	11	8	6
	Seventh party	Eighth party	Ninth party
Leader	Mostafa Fateh	Ja'far Pishevari	Qazi Muhammad
Party	Comrades Party	Azerbaijani Democratic Party	Democratic Party of Iranian Kurdistan
Leader's seat	Did not stand	Tabriz	Did not stand
Seats won	2	1	1
Prime Minister before election
Ali Soheili
Elected Prime Minister
Mohammad Sa'ed

The elections for the 14th Parliament of Iran was held in November 1943–February 1944 and more than 800 candidates ran for 136 seats.

Ervand Abrahamian wrote in 1982 that the elections were "the most prolonged, most competitive and most meaningful of all elections in modern Iran".

== Timeline ==
=== Tehran ===
- 24 November 1943: Start of the election
- 27 November 1943: End of the election
- 30 December 1943: Beginning of reading of votes
- 10 February 1944: Declaration of 11 Members-elect of parliament from Tehran. The twelfth was postponed.

== Results ==
The Tudeh Party put forward fifteen candidates, nine of whom won seats. The number of the total votes cast for the candidates of the party is estimated at 1.5 million, one-eight of the total votes cast.

Out of the 41,000 total votes cast in Tehran, Mohammad Mossadegh finished first with some 15,000 votes. All Tudeh Party candidates were defeated in the constituency.

In Isfahan, official results showed that Taghi Fadakar became the first deputy with 30,499 votes, and Hessameddin Dowlatabadi and Heidar-Ali Emami were elected for the second and third seats with 29,740 and 28,730 votes respectively.

The top two seats for Tabriz went to Kho'i and Pishevari (Soviet-supported) with 15,883 and 15,780 votes out of 47,780 respectively, but credentials of both were rejected later. The rest of the seven seats in the constituency went to Eskandari, Sadeqi, Seqat ol-Eslam, Ipakchiyan (Soviet-supported), Panahi, Mojtahedi and Sartippur.

The parties that won seats were:
Party	Seats	Ref.
National Union Party	30	
Fatherland Party	26	
Justice Party	15	
Tudeh Party	9 (Note: Including Jafar Pishevari, who was not a member but was closely associated with the party endorsed him. Pishevari did not take seat since his credentials were rejected.)	
Iran Party	6 (Note: Including Mohammad Mossadegh, who was not a member but was closely associated with the party endorsed him.)	
Comrades Party	2	

== Composition ==
According to Ervand Abrahamian, a summarized composition of the parliament that was shaped after at the election is as follows:

Fraction	Leader	Line	Seats	%
National Unionists	M. Tabatabaei	Royalist, Pro-American	30	22.05
Patriots	Z. Tabatabaei	Anti-royalist, Pro-British	26	19.11
Liberals	Farmanfarma	Anti-royalist, Pro-Soviet	20	14.70
Individuals	Mossadegh	Anti-royalist, Neutralist	16	11.76
Independents	Dashti	Anti-royalist, Pro-American	15	11.02
Democrats	Farrokh	Anti-royalist, Pro-British	11	8.08
Tudeh	Radmanesh	Anti-royalist, Pro-Soviet	8	5.88
Vacant seats			10	7.35
Total			136	100.0

Based on the lines mentioned above for each parliamentary group, the absolute majority of members of parliament were against the royal family and Mohammad Reza Pahlavi:

↓
96	30
Anti-royalist	Royalist

A characterization of members of parliament based on the foreign policy outlook of their respective parliamentary groups:

↓
28	16	45	37
Pro-Soviet	Neutralist	Pro-American	Pro-British

A characterization of members of the parliament on political spectrum could be as follows:

↓
10	25	40	26	26
Left	Centre-left	Centerism	Centre-right	Right
