= Ezzatollah Siamak =

Ezzatullah Siamak
- Died: 19 October 1954
- Cause of death: Execution by firing squad
- Resting place: Imamzadeh Abdollah, Ray
- Occupations: Military and politician
- Known for: He was one of the founders of the Military Organization of the Tudeh Party of Iran and one of the most famous Iranian songs was attributed to him.
- Political party: Tudeh Party of Iran; Tudeh Military Network

Ezzatollah Siamak (persisk:عزت‌الله سیامک) Died on Tuesday 19 October 1954, was a colonel in the Gendarmerie and one of the founders of the Military Organization of the Tudeh Party of Iran, also serving as a member of its secretariat.

== Background ==
The Military Organization of the Tudeh Party was established in 1944 by Abdolsamad Kambakhsh, Ezzatollah Siamak, and Khosro Roozbeh. Despite the repercussions resulting from the suppression of the military branch of the Tudeh Party after the uprisings of the Khorasan officers and the Azerbaijan events in 1946–47, leading to their crackdown, forced migration, and escape to the Soviet Union, the presence of Colonel Siamak, Khosrow Roozbeh, and Colonel Mohammad Ali Mobasheri, who remained safe from army arrests, ensured the core of the Military Organization of the Tudeh Party was preserved, allowing it to continue its covert activities.

Ultimately, with the accidental arrest of one of the Tudeh officers in August 1954, the Military Organization of the Tudeh Party was exposed. Most of them were arrested, executed, or imprisoned, and the remaining members fled Iran.

Colonel Siamak was among the detainees sentenced to death in a military court and, on October 19, 1954, was executed in the field of the 2nd Armored Brigade alongside nine others, marking the first group of Tudeh officers to face the firing squad.

Ahmad Shamlou dedicated his poem "Saat-e Edam" (The Execution Hour) as a lament and tribute to Colonel Siamak. The Persian song Mara Beboos has mistakenly been attributed to Colonel Siamak and circulated with the claim that he composed it for his daughter just before the execution. Another version suggests that this song was composed by Colonel Mobasheri for Colonel Siamak. However, the coincidence of the song's release which was actually composed by Heydar Raqabi with the execution of officers and the specific political conditions of that time, given the song's content, contributed to these rumors.

Colonel Siamak's body was delivered to his family for burial after the execution and laid to rest in the Imamzadeh Abdullah cemetery in Rey, Tehran.
