= Name-ye Mardom =

- General manager: Reza Radmanesh
- Political alignment: Tudeh Party
- Language: Persian
- Country: Iran
- Sister newspapers: Mardom; Razm; Khavar-e no; Rahbar
- OCLC number: 269184338
- Free online archives: 1947–1948; no. 170–335; 1948; no. 336–459; 1980–1981; no. 186–528; 2000–2010; no. 579–850

Name-ye Mardom (Persian: نامهٔ مردم, romanized: nāma-ye mardom, lit. 'The People's Letter') is a newspaper which has been published by the Tudeh Party of Iran during different periods with different outlooks.

== Content ==
Name-ye Mardom was originally an intellectual journal and emphasized on ideological subjects.

"Filthy Hope" (omid-e palid), a poem by Nima Yooshij was first published by the newspaper in 1943, with a foreword by Ehsan Tabari.

According to Ervand Abrahamian, the political line of the newspaper can be divided into two terms marked by the party's second congress in 1948. Before the second congress, it used to publish articles sympathetic towards a wide range of socialist thinkers, including Henri de Saint-Simon, Karl Kautsky, Georgi Plekhanov, and Jean-Paul Sartre. However, it then turned into a more Soviet-approved newspaper by publishing articles on Vladimir Lenin's One Step Forward, Two Steps Back; Social Realism in the Arts by Andrei Zhdanov; and works of Joseph Stalin such as Question of Nationalities, Marxism and Linguistics, Internal Contradictions of the Party and Short History of the Bolshevik Party.

After the Iranian Revolution, it served as the official daily of the party.
