= Iraj Eskandari =

Iranian politician (1907–1985)

- ایرج اسکندری
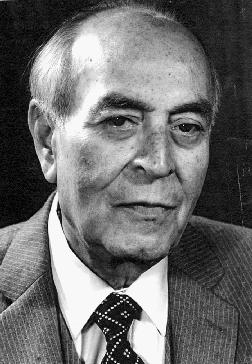

Minister of Trade, Crafts and Arts
- In office 1 August 1946 – 16 October 1946
- Prime Minister: Ahmad Qavam

Member of Parliament of Iran
- In office 6 March 1944 – 12 March 1946
- Constituency: Sari

Personal details
- Born: 1907 Tehran, Sublime State of Iran
- Died: 30 April 1985 (aged 77–78) Leipzig, East Germany
- Party: Tudeh Party
- Other political affiliations: Revolutionary Republican Party of Iran
- Relatives: Soleiman Eskandari (uncle); Abbas Eskandari (cousin)

Iraj Eskandari (Persian: ایرج اسکندری; 1907–1985) was an Iranian communist politician. A Qajar prince, Eskandari received French education. He was the first general secretary of the Tudeh Party of Iran and a member of parliament. In the summer of 1946 he was named a Minister of Commerce and Industry in Qavam's coalition cabinet.

He belonged to the "group of fifty-three". Eskandari was identified at the time as the leader of the dominant, moderate faction in the party leadership, along with Reza Radmanesh.

== Early life ==
Iraj Eskandari was born in 1907 in Tehran. His father was Yahya Mirza Eskandari, one of Qajar princes in favor of the Persian Constitution of 1906, and his uncle, Soleiman Eskandari, was also a constitutionalist Qajar prince. He started his education at first in the school of "Sepehr", then he enrolled in Dar ul-Funun and finally he studied at the Iranian school of political science. At the age of 18, Iraj Eskandari finished his studies and at 20, according to his father's will and with the help of his grandfather, he travelled to France to continue his studies in Law.

=== Introduction to Marxism ===
In France, Eskandari was introduced to Marxist ideologies by a close Bulgarian friend and a student of good knowledge of Marxism, in which he showed his utmost admiration and interest in Marxism. With the advice of his uncle Soleiman Eskandari, Iraj Eskandari linked up with a group of Iranian students studying at the Humboldt University of Berlin who had founded and lead the left-wing socialist Revolutionary Republican Party of Iran.

== Return to Iran and career ==
Iraj Eskandari returned to Iran in 1931 and started his career as a deputy prosecutor. Meanwhile, he co-founded the Marxist Donya magazine with Taqi Arani. Five years later, in 1936, Eskandari resigned his work in the Ministry of Justice.

=== "The group of fifty-three" ===
In 1938, Eskandari was arrested and sentenced to five years in prison along 52 other communists in a trial popularised as the trial of the group of "The Fifty-Three", in which a total of fifty-three politicians and activists were tried in a span of two years for involvement in communist and anti-government political activities. He spent three years in prison until the Anglo-Soviet invasion of Iran and Reza Shah's forced abdication, when he was one of the first prisoners to be freed.

=== Founding of the Tudeh Party ===
After his prison sentence was cut short, Iraj Eskandari decided to co-found the Tudeh Party of Iran with the goal of attracting the new radical generation of young progressive nationalist-communists. In his diaries, he writes that "they [the founders of the Tudeh party] had on their mind to create a national movement of democratic, patriotic and progressive forces to dominate sectarianism".

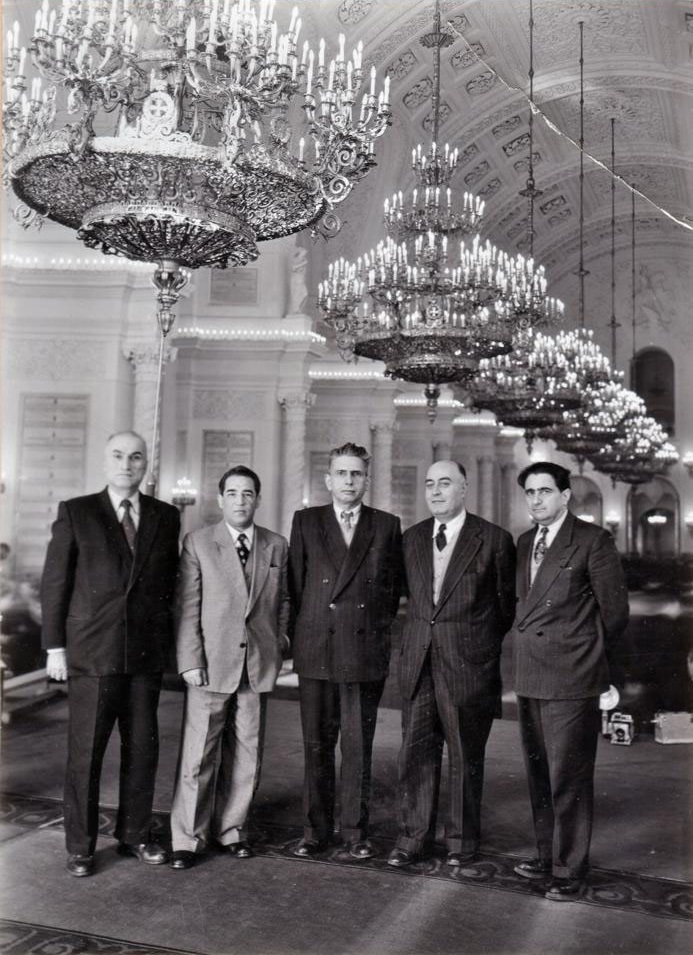
Tudeh leaders in the congress of the Soviet Union Party (Eskandari second from the right)

In the first congress of the Tudeh Party, his membership was consolidated and he became member of 3-person board of first secretaries of the Tudeh Party.

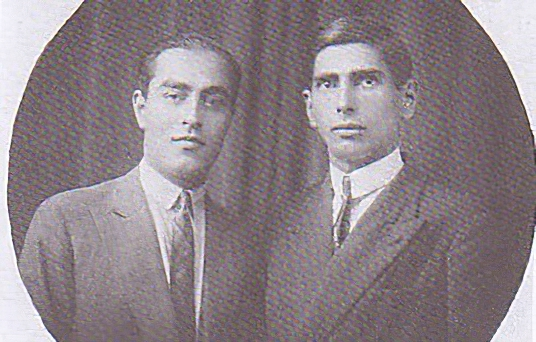
Iraj Eskandari (left) with Reza Radmanesh (right), another founding member of the Tudeh Party

=== In the Majlis ===
Eskandari was elected into the 14th Iranian Majlis, representing the Sari County of Mazandaran Province from 6 March 1944 until 12 March 1946. Inside the Majlis, he backed the Tudeh Party by advocating for the soviet exploitation of Iranian oil. Later on in his life, Eskandari went on to express regret over this action.

==== As a minister ====
In July 1946, in a controversial decision, Ahmad Qavam appointed three ministerial positions to be under the authority of the Tudeh Party, as to retain his government's relations with the Soviet Union and also as a solution to internal and foreign problems regarding the Tudeh Party. Eskandari was chosen as the minister of trade, crafts and arts until the end of the year, when he was set aside from the government's cabinet.

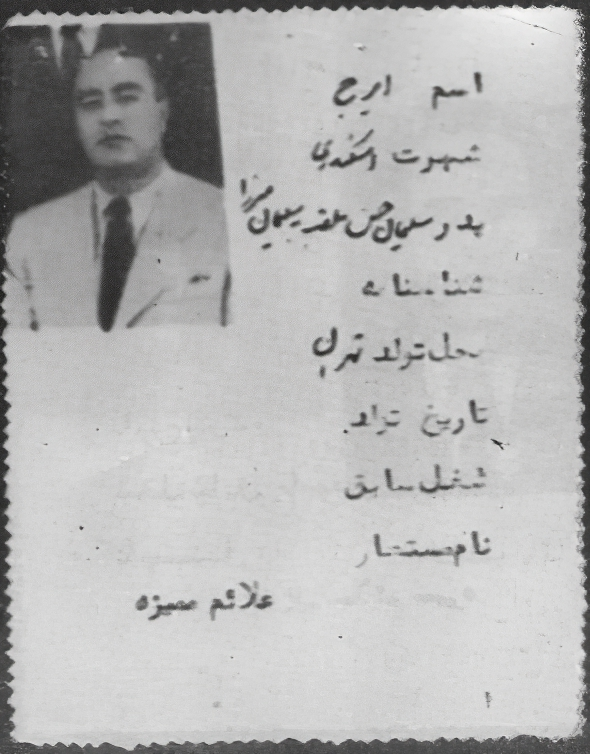
Eskandari's identification

=== Death sentence and exile ===
On February 4, 1949, Mohammad Reza Pahlavi narrowly escaped a failed assassination attempt on his life. An investigation after the attempt concluded that the Tudeh Party was the perpetrator behind the attempt. Shortly, Tehran was put to martial law and, consequently, many leaders of the Tudeh Party were arrested. During these events, Iraj Eskandari was outside Iran and, when his death sentence was announced along with three other Tudeh members, he decided to stay abroad, marking the start of his thirty-year exile.

=== First secretary of the Tudeh Party ===
In December 1969, in the 13th congress of the central committee, Eskandari returned as first secretary replacing Reza Radmanesh and in 1970, with the proposal of Ghulam Yahya Daneshian, he was elected for this role for the next seven years. He held this position until 1979, the dawn of the Iranian Revolution.

== The Iranian Revolution and dismissal ==
Iraj Eskandari's position came to an abrupt end on the first week of 1979.

On January 4, 1979, the internal conflict between Eskandari and other members of the Tudeh Party on the issue of whether he should back Ruhollah Khomeini, the proclaimed leader of the revolution, or not, led to his dismissal in the 16th congress of the central committee of the Tudeh Party. Eskandari was unwilling to support Khomeini, and as a result, he was dismissed in favor of Noureddin Kianouri, who backed Khomeini in the revolution. This is contrary to Eskandari's beliefs, however, as he stated that there were no political and organizational objections to him, and this dismissal was related to the turbulent political situation in Iran at that time.

After his dismissal, Eskandari often criticised some of the actions of the Tudeh Party. This was met with the party's strong protest, which made him take back his words. In his final days of his career, he came under the heavy pressure of the Tudeh party leaders for his opposition, specially Noureddin Kianouri, which forced him to leave Iran once and for all.

== Later years and death ==
In the following years following the consolidation of the Islamic Republic under Khomeini, all major communist and marxists groups were banned, their leaders executed and their members sentenced to prison. After Kianouri's televised confession against the Tudeh Party, the party's internal wing was practically dissolved. While outside Iran, the first "Tudeh" generation alongside Eskandari attempted to revive the party when they conducted its 18th Plenum of the Central Committee in 1983 in Bratislava, Czechoslovakia.

Iraj Eskandari continued his work, albeit less than before, in the operations of the Tudeh Party.

He died of cancer on Tuesday, April 30, 1985, in Leipzig, East Germany.

Party political offices
Preceded by Reza Radmanesh	First Secretary of the Tudeh Party of Iran; 1969–1978	Succeeded by Noureddin Kianouri
New title	Second Secretary of the Tudeh Party of Iran; 1948–1969	Succeeded by Abdolsamad Kambakhsh
Preceded by Soleiman Eskandari as Chairman	Co-General-Secretary of the Tudeh Party of Iran; 1944–1948; Served alongside: Mohammad Bahrami and Noureddin Alamouti	Succeeded by Reza Radmanesh as First-Secretary
