= Bozorg Alavi =

Writer, novelist and activist (1904–1997)

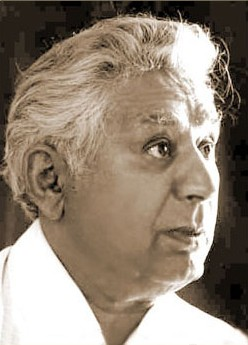
- Born: Mojtaba Alavi; February 2, 1904; Tehran, Sublime State of Persia
- Died: February 18, 1997 (aged 93); Berlin, Germany
- Known for: Writer, novelist and political activist
- Notable work: Chashm'hā'yash (Her Eyes)

Bozorg Alavi (Persian: بزرگ علوی; February 2, 1904 – February 18, 1997) was an influential Iranian writer, novelist, and political intellectual. He was a founding member of the communist Tudeh Party of Iran in the 1940s and – following the 1953 coup against Premier Mohammad Mossadegh – spent the rest of his life in exile in East Germany, first during the Pahlavi regime, then returning to Germany once more following the 1979 revolution. Cheshm'hā'yash (Her Eyes), which was published in Iran in 1952 and was subsequently banned, is considered his finest novel. Alavi was also a very close friend of Iran's famous writer Sadegh Hedayat; these two created a literary group when they were residing in Paris called "sab'e group". Although Her Eyes is considered his masterpiece, Alavi also wrote many other books, such as the novel "Chamedan" (suitcase) which was written under the influence of Freudian psychology. His other novels "Mirza", "Fifty Three Persons" and "Gilemard" are mentioned in Iranian high-school textbooks. He did return to Tehran after the revolution but did not stay too long and decided to head back to Germany. Bozorg Alavi's contribution to Iranian Literature is profound due to the modernization movement in which he was a key member.

== Biography ==
Bozorg Alavi (born Seyyed Mojtaba Alavi) was born in Tehran, Iran. He was the third of six children. His father, Seyyed Abol Hassan Alavi, took part in the 1906 Constitutional Revolution and later published (with Hasan Taqizadeh) the progressive newsletter Kaveh (Kaweh) in Germany. His paternal grandfather was Seyyed Mohammad Sarraf, a wealthy banker and merchant, who was a leading constitutionalist and member of the first Majles. Sarraf was a younger brother of Haj Seyyed Javad Khazaneh, treasurer of Nasser ed-Din Shah Qajar and later Mozaffar ed-Din Shah Qajar. Bozorg Alavi derived his nickname 'Bozorg' from being named after his great-grandfather -his Agha Bozorg- Agha Seyyed Mojtaba Ghannad, sugar merchant, confectioner and shipowner, who died in the year Bozorg was born,

Bozorg Alavi had his primary schooling in Tehran. In 1922 he was sent to Berlin along with his older brother Morteza Alavi, to study. Upon his return to Iran in 1927, he first taught German in Shiraz and later in Tehran. During these years he met and befriended Sadegh Hedayat. Around this time he became active in the meetings held by Taqi Arani, and they launched a theoretical Marxist magazine, Donya. Alavi was one of the famous 53 persons who were jailed in 1937 under the regime of Reza Shah for communist activities. Alavi himself claimed that he was not involved politically at the time and simply was in a group of literati, who among other things read communist writings. He was given a 7-year sentence, but was released after 4 years in 1941 after a general amnesty following the Allied control of Iran. Upon his release he published his Scrap Papers of Prison and Fifty Three Persons, and continued his political activities, becoming a founding member of the communist Tudeh Party of Iran and serving as editor of its publication Mardom (People). Alavi was in Germany when the 1953 Coup d'état overthrew the government of Premier Mossadegh and resulted in massive arrests and imprisonment. Alavi stayed in exile in East Berlin, teaching at Humboldt University, until the fall of the Pahlavi dynasty and the emergence of the 1979 Iranian Revolution.

In spring of 1979 he returned briefly to Iran after 25 years in exile and was warmly received by the Iranian Writers Association, including such writers/poets as Ahmad Shamlou, Mahmoud Dolatābādi, Siāvash Kasrā'ie and others. He returned to Iran a year later in 1980 for another short visit and was dismayed by the repressive turn of the revolution. He continued to live and work in Berlin, visiting Iran for the last time in 1993. He died in Berlin in 1997.

In 1936 he had married Margarita (Gita) Scheineson from Brussels, who later was a source of inspiration for his novel Chashm'hā'yash. Before his exile, he married his cousin Fatameh Alavi (daughter of Seyyed Abolfath Fadai Alavi, Secretary-General of the Ministry of Finance, and Merafagh Tabatabai) and had a son, Mani. In 1956, he married Gertrud Paarszh in Germany who stayed with him until his death.

== Selected works ==
Major Works:

- Chamedan (The Suitcase) (1934)
- Varaq Pareh'ha-ye Zendan (Scrap Papers from Prison) (1941)
- Panjah-o Seh Nafar (Fifty Three Persons) (1942)
- Nameh' ha va Dastan'ha-ye digar (Letters and Other Stories) (1952)
- Cheshmhayash (Her Eyes) (1952)

Other Writings:

- Div ... Div (Demon ... Demon), in the collection Aniran (Non-Iranian) (1931)
- Uzbakha (The Uzbeks) (1948)
- Kämpfendes Iran (1955, Berlin)
- Geschichte und Entwicklung der modernen persischen Literatur (1964, Berlin)
- Salariha (The Salari Family)
- Mirza

Translations into Persian:

- Anton Chekhov's The Cherry Orchard
- Samuil Marshak's The Twelve Months
- George Bernard Shaw's Mrs. Warren's Profession
- J.B. Priestley's An Inspector Calls
- Friedrich Schiller's Jungfrau von Orleans
- Theodor Nöldeke's Das Iranische Nationalepos
