= Abbas Eskandari =

1940s politician in Iran

Member of Parliament of Iran
- In office 12 June 1947 – 28 July 1949
- Constituency: Hamedan

Governor of Tehran
- In office 17 June 1946 – 18 October 1946
- Appointed by: Ahmad Qavam

Personal details
- Born: 1897
- Died: 1955 (aged 57–58)
- Party: Tudeh Party
- Relatives: Iraj Eskandari (cousin)

Abbas Eskandari (Persian: عباس اسکندری, romanized: ʿAbbās Eskandarī; 1897–1955) was an Iranian Communist politician and a co-founder of Tudeh Party of Iran.

== Career ==
Eskandari was a co-founder of the Tudeh Party of Iran, as well as the editor of Siyasat (lit. 'Politics') daily, the official organ of the party. However, he was deemed by the establishment figures of the party, Ovanessian and Kambakhsh, too "corrupted" by wealth, and was soon eased out.

On 17 June 1946, he was appointed as the governor of Tehran by Ahmad Qavam. He was one of three communist governors who took office at the time, the other two were of Kermanshah and Isfahan. On 18 October, one day before Qavam dismissed cabinet ministers from Tudeh, he was replaced by Mousavizadeh.

He later served as a deputy in the 15th Majlis, representing Hamedan. Fakhreddin Azimi describes him as "the vociferous supporter of Qavam who had found it politically opportune to champion Iran's sovereign rights over its sources of oil as well as over Bahrain's". In September 1948, he offered a £80,000 reward for anyone who succeeds in restoring Bahrain to Iranian soil and solving the problem with the Anglo-Persian Oil Company.
