= Rahbar (newspaper) =

Discontinued communist daily newspaper in Iran (1942–1946)

- Type: Daily newspaper
- Publisher: Tudeh Party of Iran
- Editor-in-chief: Iraj Eskandari
- Founded: February 1943
- Ceased publication: 1946
- Political alignment: Communism
- Language: Persian
- Headquarters: Tehran
- Sister newspapers: Zafar, Razm, Mardom, several local publications

Rahbar (Persian: رهبر, lit. 'Leader') was an Iranian Persian language daily newspaper, published from Tehran. It was the central organ of the communist Tudeh Party of Iran. The decision to launch Rahbar was taken at the First Party Conference held in October 1942, after that Abbas Eskandari, the editor of the erstwhile central organ of the party Siasat, had been expelled from the party.

The paper was first published in February 1943. In the initial phase of Rahbar the Tudeh Party was not officially a communist party, and the editorial line of the newspaper was non-communist constitutionalism. During the years of the Second World War, Rahbar (and other Tudeh organs) focused on anti-fascist and pro-peace agitation. During this period it was financed by the Soviet Union.

Iraj Eskandari served as the editor-in-chief of Rahbar. As with the other two key publications of the party (Mardom and Razm) it was edited by a member of the Tudeh parliamentary faction in the Majles.

In June 1943 the trade union organization led by the Tudeh Party, the Central Council of Unions of Iran, decided to adopt Rahbar as their main organ, substituting the union publication Giti until the re-launching of a separate trade unionist newspaper. From June 21, 1943, onwards Rahbar carried a section titled "the party and the workers".

When Rahbar celebrated its anniversary it sold 60,000 copies, almost reaching the levels of the main newspaper of the country, Ettela'at.

In the oil-rich areas in southern Iran, the Anglo-Iranian Oil Company and local authorities enforced a ban on reading and distributing Rahbar. Workers caught reading or selling the paper were usually dismissed from their employments.

On 23 August 1945 Rahbar was shut down by the orders of a military commandant in Tehran.

The publication of Rahbar (as well as the labour newspaper Zafar) was again suspended by the government on 8 December 1946, citing the attacks of the paper against the pro-American policies of the Iranian government. The ban was however lifted by the end of the month.
