= Mardom (newspaper) =

Iranian newspaper

- Type: Weekly
- Publisher: Tudeh Party
- Founded: 1 February 1942
- Ceased publication: 1980
- Political alignment: Communist
- Language: Persian
- Headquarters: Tehran
- Country: Iran
- Sister newspapers: Name-ye Mardom; Razm; Khavar-e no; Rahbar; Zafar
- OCLC number: 269184338
- Free online archives: 1942; no. 1–227; 1948; no. 336–459; 1949–1954; no. 1–47/156–247; 1965–1979; no. 1–224; 1979–1980; no. 1–184

Mardom (Persian: مردم, lit. 'People') was the official newspaper of the Tudeh Party of Iran. It was published on a weekly basis.

== History and profile ==
Mardom began circulation on 1 February 1942. It was started to contribute to the Tudeh party's achievement of political power. During World War II the paper was part of the campaign against the Axis powers. The paper was one of the most read publications in Iran in the early 1950s.

== Staff ==
During its early years, Reza Radmanesh and Khalil Maleki served as its editors. Mostafa Fateh also co-edited the newspaper for some time.
