= Ranjbaran =

Ranjbaran may refer to:

- Laborers' Party of Iran (also known simply as Ranjbaran), Iranian political party
- Behzad Ranjbaran, Persian composer (born 1955)
