= 14th Iranian Majlis =

14th National Consultative Assembly
←	13th	15th	→

Overview
- Jurisdiction: Imperial State of Iran
- Meeting place: Baharestan
- Term: 6 March 1944 – 12 March 1946
- Election: November 1943 and February 1944

National Consultative Assembly
- Members: 137
- Speaker: Mohammad-Sadegh Tabatabaei
- 1st Deputy: Javad Ameri (1st session); Hashemi Malek Madani (2nd, 3rd, 4th sessions)
- 2nd Deputy: Amirteymour Kalali (1st, 4th sessions); Abdullah Moazzami (2nd, 3rd sessions)

Sessions
- 1st: 2 April 1944 – 5 October 1944
- 2nd: 6 October 1944 – 1 April 1945
- 3rd: 2 April 1945 – 4 October 1945
- 4th: 5 October 1945 – 12 March 1946

14th Iranian Majlis was commenced on 6 March 1944 and ended on 12 March 1946.

In a national history of factionalism, it was the assembly of intense factionalism. As many as seven rival groups labelled fraktions -a term borrowed from the German parliament- in constantly competing with each other, wasted one quarter of the session in obstructionism, and brought persistent instability on the governmental level: during these 24 months, there were seven changes of premiers, nine changes of cabinets, and 110 changes of ministers. The 14th Parliament sat during one of the rare periods in which there was some degree of freedom for political expression.

== Fraction members ==
Fraction	Members	Leader
National Unity (Ettehad Melli)	33	Mohammad-Sadegh Tabatabaei
Individuals (Monfaredin)	30	Mohammad Mossadegh
Homeland (Mihan)	24	Hadi Taheri
Independent (Mostaghel)	15	Ali Dashti
Freedom (Azadi)	11	Mohammad Vali Farmanfarmaian
Democrat	8	Mehdi Farrokh
Tudeh	6	Fereydoun Keshavarz
Source: Majlis Research Center
