= Khosro Roozbeh =

Iranian military officer and activist (1915–1958)

- خسرو روزبه
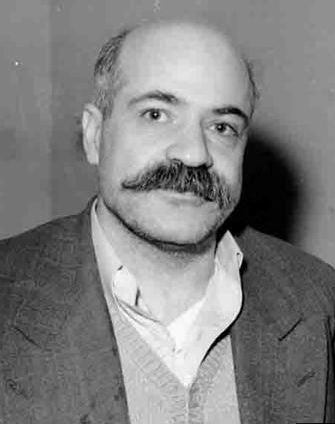
- Born: 24 August 1915; Malāyer, Sublime State of Iran
- Died: 11 May 1958 (aged 42); Heshmatiyeh Prison, Tehran, Imperial State of Iran
- Cause of death: Execution by firing squad
- Political party: Tudeh Party of Iran
- Military career
- Education: Officers' Academy
- Branch: Imperial Iranian Army
- Service years: 1939–1947
- Rank: Captain
- Unit: Artillery

Khosro Roozbeh (Persian: خسرو روزبه; 24 August 1915 – 11 May 1958) was an Iranian military officer, mathematician, writer on political and cultural affairs and the chief of military branch of the Communist Tudeh Party of Iran and has been called "probably the most controversial as well as the best-known martyr of the communist movement in Iran".

Roozbeh was the author of a number of pamphlets on chess, artillery warfare, and together with co-author Ardeshir Ovanessian, the country's first political lexicon, Vocabulary of Political and Social Terms.

== Overview ==
Roozbeh of Lak Kurdish origin, the son of an army officer, was born in Malāyer, and grew up in Hamadan and Kermanshah, Iran. He entered the army and excelled at the military academy, won a teaching post at the Officers' College, impressing both students and his superior.

Involved in left-wing groups, he was arrested after a mutiny in Khurasan and put on trial in 1946. There he declared himself a "full-fledged revolutionary" who did not belong to the "merely ... reformist" Tudeh party. He was convicted of spreading sedition, cashiered from the army and sentenced to 15 years hard labor. He escaped four years later and set up the Military Organization of the Tudeh party (made up of members of the Iranian military). By 1954, the organization had over 500 members.

According to the British Embassy in Iran, Roozbeh was a

Red Pimpernel, who in a series of disguises walked into and out of innumerable baited police traps with the swashbuckling courage that made him a figure of legendary proportions, both to the Party, the security authorities, and the general public."

In his political beliefs Roozbeh opposed liberalism and deemed some of the Tudeh leaders "mere reformers," "bourgeois liberals," and "parliamentary lobbyists." In his memoirs, Ovanessian praises Roozbeh as a sincere but impatient radical in need of a firm hand Writing in another book, Ervand Abrahamian describes him as being "contemptuous" of the Tudeh party "for being too `moderate`," and resigning from it at the time of the trial and "not rejoined until the early 1950s."

During this hiatus from the party he carried out five assassinations according to his confessions. Four of the victims were party members suspected of selling information to the police after the 1953 coup, one of these being Hesham Lankrani, a member of a prominent clerical family from Azerbaijan. The fifth killing was of Mohammad Massoud, a maverick newspaper editor and opponent of the regime. Roozbeh thought that "the assassination of such a popular anticourt journalist ... would polarize Iran and thus radicalize the Tudeh," and emphasized that he carried out the Massoud assassination without the party's knowledge. In the words of Ervand Abrahamian, "Roozbeh was a radical in the tradition of Bakhunin — not of Marx and Engels."

Roozbeh was wounded and captured after a shootout in July 1957. He was interrogated, tried in camera, and executed secretly in Qezel Qal'eh prison in May 1958. Before the execution his legs were broken up. One of Roozbeh more controversial activities was confessed to interrogators before he died.

== Legacy ==
The night before his execution, Roozbeh composed a seventy-page testament to condemn capitalism to praise socialism, and to explain why he was willing to die for the "great revolutionary cause" of the Tudeh party. The party posthumously elevated him to the central committee and made him into an icon equal to Taqi Arani. It published laudatory articles every year commemorating his martyrdom. It erected a statue in his honor in Italy. The Persian poet Ahmad Shamlou composed a couplet in praise of him. And "many leftists — including non-Tudeh members — named their newborn sons after him. In brief, he became the symbol of uncompromising opposition, heroic resistance, and ultimate self-sacrifice."

Party political offices
Preceded by Abdossamad Kambakhsh as Secretary-in-Charge	Member of Secretariat of the Tudeh Military Network; 1944–1954; Served alongside: Ezatollah Siamak and Mohammad-Ali Mobasheri	Unknown
