= Donya (magazine) =

Iranian cultural magazine (1934–1935)

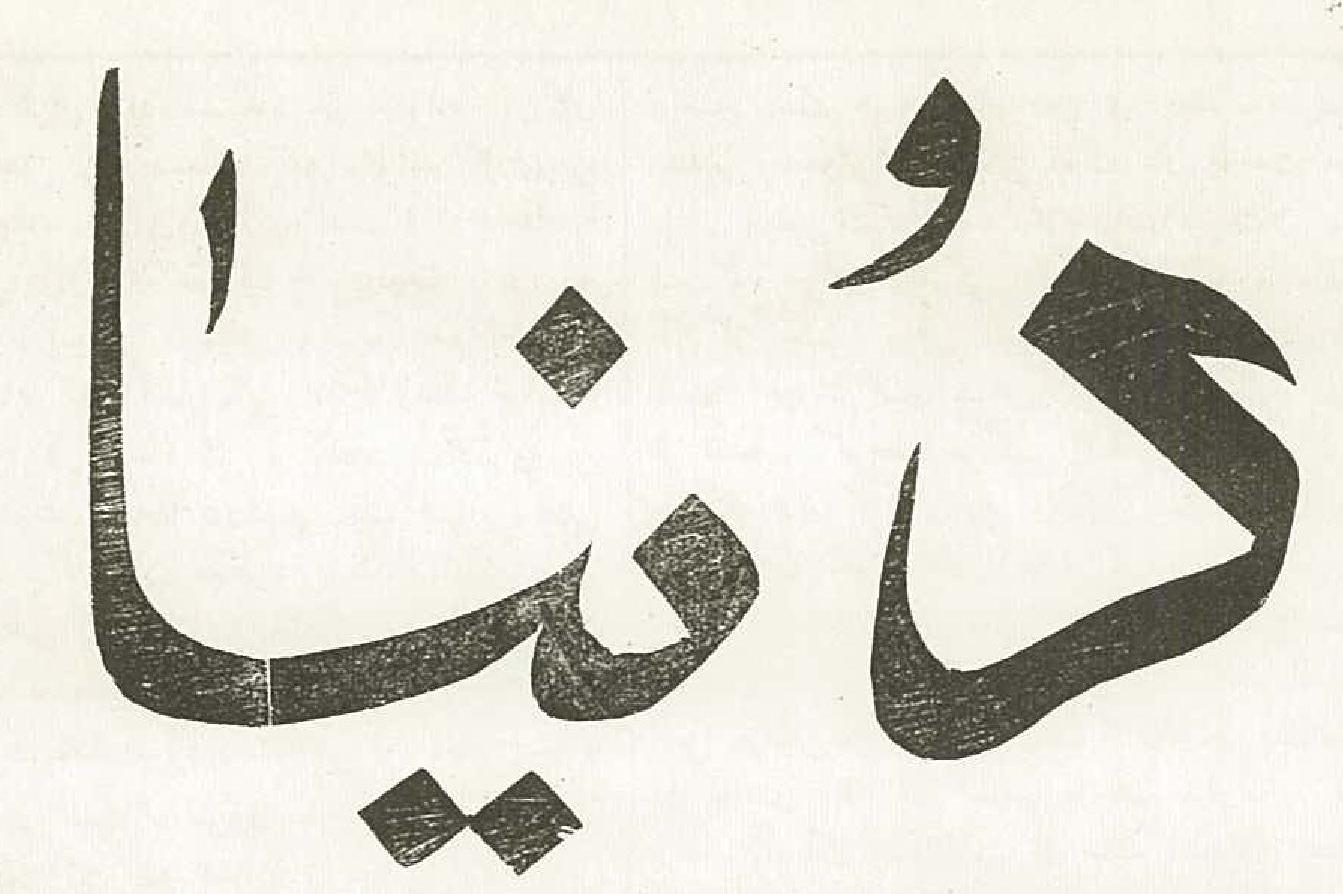
- Editor: Taqi Arani
- Categories: Theoretical cultural magazine
- Frequency: Monthly
- Founder: Taqi Arani; Iraj Iskandari; Bozorg Alavi
- First issue: February 1934
- Final issue: May–June 1935
- Country: Iran
- Based in: Tehran
- Language: Persian

Donya (Persian: دنیا, lit. 'The World') was a Persian-language monthly Marxist theoretical cultural magazine that produced 12 issues between February 1934 and May/June 1935. It was based in Tehran, Iran.

== History and profile ==
Donya was first published in February 1934. Three Marxist Iranian intellectuals, Taqi Arani, Iraj Iskandari and Bozorg Alavi, who were part of the first cell of the newly founded Iranian Communist Party established the magazine. Arani also served as the editor-in-chief of the monthly magazine, which was based in Tehran.

Its major goal was to introduce Marxism to Iranians and to provide a basis for a prospective Marxist group. Donya featured articles on politics and history from a Marxist perspective. It supported positivist Marxism and cultural hegemony, but avoided direct discussions of Marxism, class struggle and revolution. Instead, it covered indirect discussions of cultural and philosophical views. The magazine supported the following view of the transgressive thought: "Humankind has reached a stage in the evolution of civilization that it wants to conduct its society according to materialist and logical principles."

Donya published a total of 12 volumes before its closure in 1935. Its last issue was dated May-June.

== Legacy ==
A publication with the same name was launched by Tudeh Party, an Iranian Marxist-Leninist communist party, in 1960. It billed itself as the direct successor of Donya.
