= Reza Roosta =

Iranian political activist

- Born: 1901; Vishka Suqeh, Rasht
- Died: 1967 (aged 65–66); East Germany
- Occupation: politician
- Known for: He was a member of the central committee of the Tudeh Party of Iran and among the arrested group known as The Fifty-Three.
- Political party: Tudeh Party of Iran
- Children: Homa Rousta

Reza Roosta (Persian: رضا روستا 1901; Vishka, Rasht – January 1967, East Germany) was one of the communist activists and leaders of the Tudeh Party of Iran in the early 1950s. His daughter, Homa Rousta, was a prominent actress in Iranian cinema.

== Biography ==
Reza Roosta, the son of Mohammad, known as Mohammad Amu, was born in 1901 in the village of Vishka, near Rasht. He spent some time working as an apprentice in the village's coffee shop. Eventually, at the age of eleven, he went to Rasht with his uncle and, with the support of "Gholoush-Bik," a relative of Haydar Khan Amo-oghli from the Caucasus, enrolled in the Ferdowsi School in Rasht.

He began his education in his hometown and later joined the Gilan Communists led by Haydar Khan Amo-oghli. After the suppression of the Jungle Movement, he went to the Soviet Union and spent time in party schools until 1924. In that year, he returned to Iran. In 1930, he was arrested, sentenced to execution, and later to eight years in prison. He was released in 1936, re-arrested with 53 others in 1937, and imprisoned in Saveh until 1941. In 1947, he went to the Soviet Union and was elected to the Central Committee of the Tudeh Party of Iran. He then went to Berlin and became the Secretary-General of the Central Council of Iranian United Syndicates and a member of the executive committee of the World Federation of Trade Unions. In 1959, he was sentenced to execution in absentia. Until his death in 1967, he was in charge of the Tudeh Party's overseas workers.

== Wealth ==
Reza Roosta had considerable wealth and properties in Rasht and three counties in Gilan province, as well as numerous properties in two republics of the current Russian Federation.
