= Mardom =

Mardom is a Persian word meaning 'people'. It may refer to:

- Party of the Iranian People, an Iranian nationalist party
- People's Party (Iran), an Iranian royalist party also referred to as Mardom in some English sources
- Mardom, the official newspaper of the Tudeh Party of Iran
