= Zafar (newspaper) =

Iranian daily newspaper (1944–1947)

- Type: Daily newspaper
- Owner: Tudeh Party Workers' Union
- Founded: 22 June 1944
- Ceased publication: February 1947
- Political alignment: Communism
- Language: Persian
- Headquarters: Tehran
- Country: Pahlavi Iran
- Sister newspapers: Mardum; Rahbar

Zafar (Persian: ظفر, lit. 'The Victory') was an Iranian daily newspaper which was published in Tehran between 1944 and 1947. The paper was affiliated with the Tudeh Party and the sister publication of Mardum and Razm. Zafar was the official organ of the party's workers' union, namely Tudeh Party Workers' Union.

== History and profile ==
Zafar was first published in Tehran on 22 June 1944. The license of the paper belonged to Rıza Rusta, head of the Tudeh Party Workers' Union. The paper was a daily publication and an official media outlet of the Union. It featured articles about the activities of the Tudeh Party, including those of the party founders.

Until 1947 the paper was banned several times and replaced by other publications. For instance, on 8 December 1946 Zafar and its sister publication Rahbar were shut down by the Iranian government due to their harsh criticisms over the policies towards the US. Under such conditions it was clandestinely distributed in the country. Zafar reappeared in January 1947 when its ban dated 8 December 1946 had been removed on 31 December 1946. The paper continued to be published in February 1947, but soon it was closed once more and was not restarted again.
