= Comrades Party =

- Leader: Mustafa Fateh
- Founded: 1942
- Newspaper: Emruz va Farda
- Ideology: Socialism
- Political position: Left-wing

The Comrades Party or the Compatriots Party (Persian: حزب همرهان, romanized: Hezb-e Hamrahān) was a left-wing Iranian political party active during the 1940s. The party was part of a wave of political groupings established in the early 1940s following the removal of Rezā Shāh.

== Establishment ==
Mostafa Fateh

The party was formed in October/November 1942 by Mustafa Fateh, an economist who was close to the Tudeh Party of Iran but who disliked the close relationship which that party had with the Soviet Union. Fateh, who had been an important figure in the Anglo-Iranian Oil Company edited the Tudeh paper Mardom for a time before establishing his own journal, Emruz va Farda. Abbas Narraqi, another founding member had been one of 53 men imprisoned in 1937 on charges of conspiring to lead a communist revolution.

== Platform ==
According to L. P. Elwell-Sutton, the party was more orthodox than the Tudeh Party in advocating a socialist cause.

The Comrades Party called for two main aims, political equality to all Iranians and nationalisation of the means of production.

== Parliamentary representation ==
The party put forward ten candidates in the 1944 election, all of whom came from professional backgrounds. Two members of the Comrades Party were elected to the Majlis of Iran where they sat with the Individuals' Caucus, a group they made up along with the Iran Party and various independents, all of whom largely followed the lead of Mohammad Mosaddegh.

The party split in 1944 following a dispute in Isfahan where clashes between striking workers and local tribes loyal to the Shah had broken out amid accusations that the workers were attempting to lead a communist revolution. The Majlis-based wing of the Comrades Party condemned the workers and affirmed their loyalty to the Shah but another external group joined Tudeh in supporting the strikers and this group, which maintained control of Emruz va Farda, broke away to form the Socialist Party.

== See also ==
- Iranian Revolution
- Organizations of the Iranian Revolution
- The history of the parliament in Iran
- Board of Directors of the Islamic Consultative Assembly
- Women in the Islamic Consultative Assembly
