= Justice Party (Iran) =

- Leader: Ali Dashti
- Founded: December 1941
- Dissolved: 1946
- Membership: ~ 400
- Ideology: Nationalism; Reformism; Monarchism; Anti-communism
- Political position: Centre-right

Justice Party (Persian: حزب عدالت, romanized: Ḥezb-e ʿEdālat) was a political party in Iran, led by Ali Dashti who co-founded it with other intellectuals who had participated in the politics of the early 1920s. Other prominent politicians include Jamal Emami, Ebrahim Kajanouri, Farajollah Bahrami, Jamshid Alam and Abulqassem Amini.

The party was "an association somewhat resembling a private club, with little organizational cohesion or collective sense of identity". Idologically, its character consisted of a centre-right nationalism and advocated general reforms in the administration and legal and educational systems.

The party opposed the Tudeh Party and supported a constitutional monarchy in Iran. According to Hossein Dadgar, a leading member of the party, it was formed "to counter the 'Fifty-three' communists who had founded the dangerous Tudeh party."

They backed Mohsen Sadr's government and were considered opposition to the governments of Ahmad Qavam and Ali Soheili.
