= Revolutionary Organization of the Tudeh Party =

- Founded: 1966
- Dissolved: 1979
- Split from: Tudeh Party of Iran
- Merged into: Laborers' Party of Iran
- Newspaper: Setare-ye Sorkh
- Ideology: Maoism
- Political position: Far-left

The Revolutionary Organization of the Tudeh Party of Iran (ROTPI; Persian: سازمان انقلابی حزب تودهٔ ایران, romanized: sāzmān-e enqelābī-e Ḥezb-e tūda-ye Īrān) was a Maoist group that split from the Tudeh Youth Organization in 1966, following the Sino-Soviet split.

== History ==
The ROTPI's history is traced back to February 1964, when a group of young members of the Tudeh Party of Iran became dissatisfied with the party's leadership over siding with the Soviet Union during the Sino-Soviet split. The group maintained that Tudeh was reformist (in contrast to being revolutionary) and claimed that it wanted to revive the defunct Communist Party of Persia. The base of its core membership was abroad, made up of students studying in Western Europe.
