= Noureddin Alamouti =

Iranian judge and politician (1901–1965)

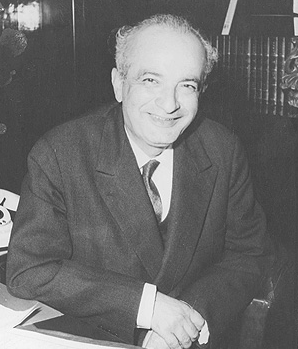

Minister of Justice
- In office 5 May 1961 – 19 July 1962
- Prime Minister: Ali Amini

Personal details
- Born: 1901 Varak, Qazvin, Sublime State of Iran
- Died: 1965 (aged 63–64) Tehran, Imperial State of Iran
- Party: Democrat Party (1947–48); Tudeh Party (1941–47); Democrat Party (1919)

Noureddin Alamouti (Persian: نورالدین الموتی; 1901–1965) was an Iranian judge and politician. He served as the justice minister under the cabinet of Ali Amini, during which he was noted for forming a powerful anti-corruption division that led to "the last serious attempt to realize the rule of law" in Pahlavi Iran.

== Early life ==
He came from the rural district of Alamut. In 1919, he joined the Democrat Party and was imprisoned in 1923 for "agitating among the local peasantry". Alamouti was employed at the justice ministry during the rule of Reza Shah.

== Political career ==
One of the members of the "group of fifty-three", he was jailed in 1938. He later joined the Tudeh Party of Iran immediately after its establishment in 1941 and was elected to its provisional central committee. At the party's first congress in 1944, he was elected to the central committee and served as the party's general secretary, a position he shared with Mohammad Bahrami and Iraj Eskandari.

He was listed by Tudeh for a Tehran seat in the Iranian legislative election, 1943–1944, but was defeated. In 1946, Alamouti was excluded from the central committee because he was "not [a] full-fledged Marxist". He left the party in 1947 and joined the entourage of Ahmad Qavam. Alamouti was allegedly detested by Mohammad Reza Shah.

== Ministry ==
Alamouti was appointed as the justice minister in 1961 and served in that capacity until July 1962. He launched a campaign to fight corruption and abuse of power among the ruling elite that led to the jailing of several high-ranking officials, including police chief general Alavi-Moghadam (charged with bribe taking), military prosecutor Hossein Azmoudeh and former plan and budget head Abol Hassan Ebtehaj (charged with $69 million embezzlement). He appointed Ahmad Sayyed Javadi as prosecutor of Tehran, who joined him in the anti-corruption legal activism. Among the military officers prosecuted during the period, were General Kia, Zarghami, Daftari, Khazaei and Nevissi. After he left office following Ali Amini's resignation, all detainees were released and the charges were dropped, however the effects of the activism were not forgotten. Three years later, some 100 judges were dismissed.

Party political offices
| Preceded by Soleiman Eskandari as Chairman | Co-General-Secretary of the Tudeh Party of Iran; 1944–1947; Served alongside: Mohammad Bahrami and Iraj Eskandari | Succeeded by Reza Radmanesh as First-Secretary |
