= Tudeh Military Network =

Iranian espionage organization

- Founding leader: Abdolsamad Kambakhsh
- Leaders: Khosro Roozbeh (1944–1957); Mehdi Partovi (1970s –1980); Rahman Hatfi (1980); Mehdi Partovi (1980–1983)
- Dates active: 1944–1957; 1970s–1983
- Active regions: Iran
- Ideology: Communism; Marxism–Leninism; Left-wing nationalism
- Political position: Far-left
- Size: ≈600 (1954) ≈100 (1983)
- Part of: Tudeh Party of Iran
- Wars: Cold War; Khorasan Officers' Uprising; Iran crisis of 1946; 1953 Iranian coup d'état; Iranian Revolution; Nojeh coup plot; Iran–Iraq War

The Officers' Organization (Persian: سازمان افسران) or the Military Organization (Persian: سازمان نظامی) of the Tudeh Party, also known as Tudeh Military Network, was an intelligence gathering network that infiltrated the Iranian Armed Forces using a clandestine cell system method.

== Background ==
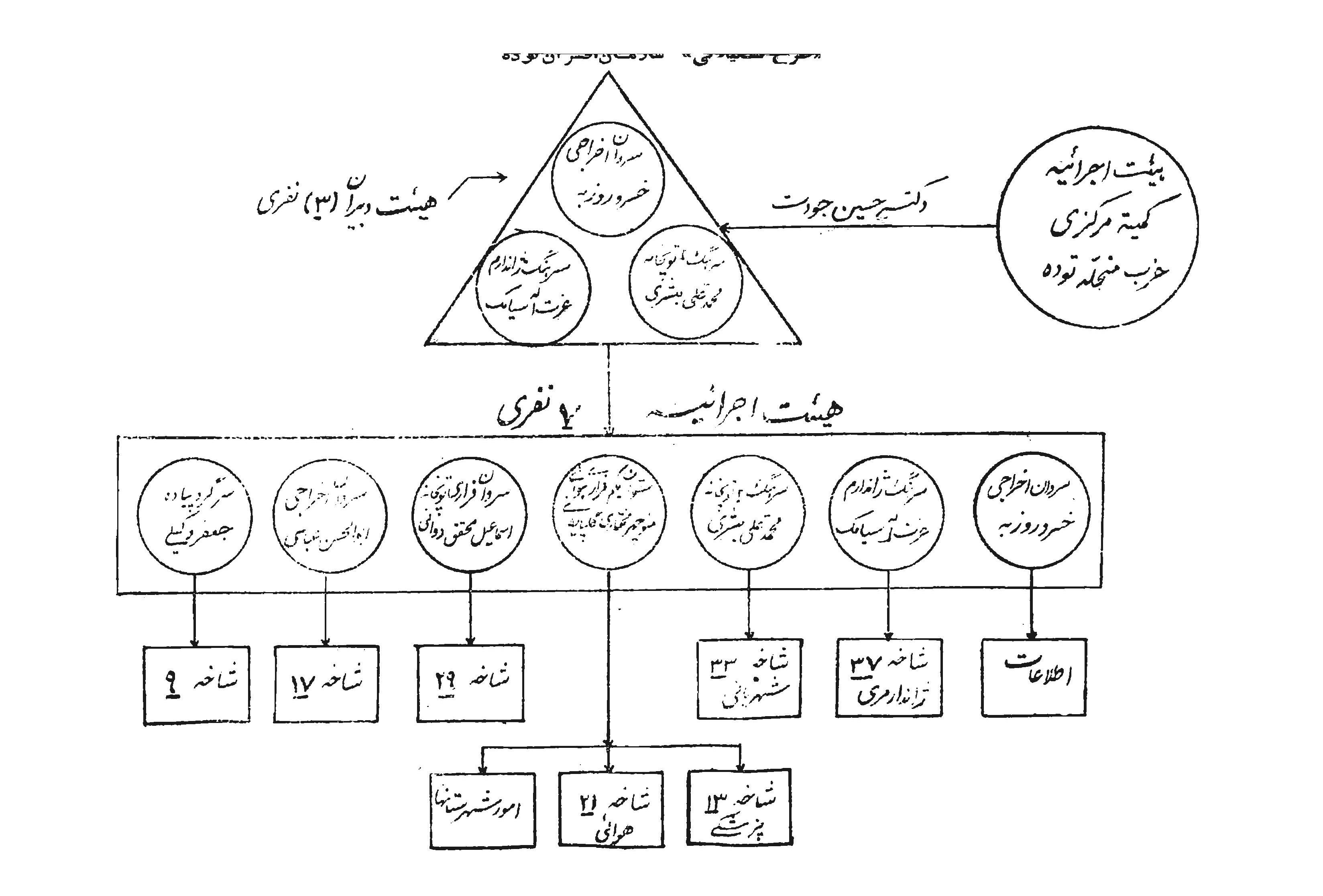
Organizational chart of the Tudeh Military Network

The Tudeh Party’s military organization was founded in 1944 by Abdolsamad Kambakhsh, Ezzatollah Siamak, and Khosro Roozbeh. Subsequently, Captain Khosro Roozbeh was chosen as the head of the organization's executive committee.

The Officers' Organization consisted of a secretariat and an executive committee. The secretariat had three members, who, at the time of the members' arrest in 1954, were:

1. Captain Khosro Roozbeh (under the pseudonym Saeedi)

2. Colonel Ezzatollah Siamak

3. Colonel Mohammad-Ali Mobasheri

Among the members, Captain Khosro Roozbeh was responsible for the party's intelligence branch.

Roozbeh worked at the Military Academy until 1945. Following the Khorasan Officers' Uprising, he went into hiding for a period. The result of this era was the writing of the book Blind Obedience, which was published against the ruling system of the Pahlavi army under the pseudonym "Sekhor" (Captain Khosrow Roozbeh).

== The Khorasan Officers' Uprising ==
The peak of the officers' activities occurred in 1945 with the Khorasan Officers' Uprising. Tudeh officers, including Eskandani and Colonel Azar, who had little hope for the Tudeh Party's political victory to seize power, concluded that: "The Tudeh Party is a revolutionary party; we must act revolutionarily and pull the party along behind us." The military personnel believed that the public was ready for an uprising at the same time foreign forces were evacuating Iran. Conflicting reports exist regarding the Tudeh Party's awareness of this uprising, but the general strategy of the party did not align well or agree with this movement.

On the night of August 15, 1945, the uprising of the officers of the 8th Khorasan Division began and ended in failure. This uprising and its subsequent suppression created problems for the party: by attributing the revolt to Tudeh Party officers, the party came under pressure, and many of their activities were halted.

The Khorasan Officers' Uprising also placed the party's military organization in a difficult position. Their revolt alerted the ruling establishment and the Army General Staff—headed by Major General Arfa—to the Tudeh Party's influence among the officers. This led to the arrest of forty officers from the party's military branch, reducing the number of remaining officers to about twenty.

Following the announcement of the formation of the Azerbaijani Democratic Party in September 1945, the remaining officers from the Khorasan Uprising and several other officers from the military organization joined the party to train its military personnel. This action once again provoked the army and the G2 (military intelligence), leading to severe crackdowns against the Officers' Organization and the party itself. After the collapse of the Azerbaijan People's Government in 1946, the regime executed many of the arrested officers, while some took refuge in the Soviet Union along with other forces of the Azerbaijan Democratic Party. This was a fatal blow to the structure of the Tudeh Party and its Officers' Organization.

Following the Khorasan Officers' Uprising and the Azerbaijan incident, the casualties among party officers in the events of 1945–1946 were so heavy that they practically dismantled the Officers' Organization. Those who survived fled to the Soviet Union. However, the survival of Colonel Siamak, Khosro Roozbeh, and Colonel Mobasheri—who remained safe from the wave of arrests that became widespread in the army and other government agencies after the Khorasan Uprising, the defeat in Azerbaijan, and ultimately the February 4, 1949 assassination attempt on the Shah—formed another initial core. This core reshaped the military organization in a completely covert manner, this time under the direct and limited supervision of the leadership of the Tudeh Party of Iran.The Tudeh Party of Iran, which had inherited the legacy of the Azerbaijan Democratic Party's defeat and whose forces were facing division and defection from all sides, declared the Officers' Organization dissolved at the proposal of Khalil Maleki. A number of officers, including Captain Khosro Roozbeh, protested this decision and independently formed the "Organization of Freedom-Loving Officers of Iran."This group embraced pragmatism. When the group's activities hit a dead end, discussions arose about reuniting with the Tudeh Party. This became possible in 1948 following the Second Congress of the Tudeh Party of Iran and changes in its leadership cadre. From 1950 onward, the party selected the executive committee of the military organization, and this bond continued until the coup. The executive committee of the military organization had five branches:

- Organization Branch
- Propaganda Branch
- Training Branch
- Finance Branch
- Intelligence Branch

The organization's activities expanded, and a large number of young officers rejoined the party. The organization's masterpiece occurred in 1950, which was orchestrating the prison escape of the imprisoned leaders of the Tudeh Party and Khosrow Roozbeh from Tehran's Qasr Prison.

== The August 1953 Coup ==
The chief of staff for General Fazlollah Zahedi, who was a member of the Tudeh Party's secret military organization, had informed the Tudeh Party of Iran about the coup plans three days before it took place.

== Discovery of the Organization ==
Following the coup, the Shahrbani Intelligence Department aggressively pursued the hidden members of the Officers' Organization. On August 12, 1954, the police accidentally arrested Lieutenant Abolhassan Abbasi, an associate of Khosro Roozbeh and the head of the "Tudeh Party Intelligence Office." He was carrying three notebooks filled with mathematical formulas. Shortly after, it was revealed that these notes contained a cipher holding the names of all members of the secret Officers' Organization.

Out of more than 600 arrested officers, 36 individuals, including Khosro Roozbeh, were executed.

During the years of exile and the establishment of the Tudeh Party of Iran's secretariat in East Germany, former members of the Tudeh Party Officers' Organization—specifically Mohammad Pourhormozan and Amir Shefabakhsh—collaborated with the Stasi (the East German secret police) and informed them of the party's internal developments. This was documented in the investigative paper titled "Charlie and Reza; From the Tudeh Party of Iran Officers' Organization to the East German Security Service," written by Bahman Zebardast in issue 113 of the Negah-e No quarterly journal.

== The Iranian Revolution ==
Following the Iranian Revolution, the clandestine military network of the Tudeh Party of Iran within the armed forces became known simply as the Military Organization, counting 114 members (including both military personnel and civilian officials). This military structure was gradually organized starting in mid-1979, with Mehdi Partovi placed at its helm by Noureddin Kianouri, the First Secretary of the party. Partovi maintained individual contact with four senior officers: Captain Afzali, Colonel Kabiri, Colonel Attarian, and Colonel Shams. He connected with the remaining military personnel through Shahrok Jhangiri and Amir Moazez (the heads of two primary sub-branches). These two sub-branch leaders interacted directly, or through 8 branch managers, with 50 and 55 military personnel respectively. All personal information and identities within the organization were managed under pseudonyms, and the entire apparatus was directed by Mehdi Partovi.

Despite the Tudeh Party's support for the Iranian Revolution during critical junctures—such as during the Nojeh coup plot and the Iran–Iraq War—many of the party's leaders, members, and sympathizers were arrested in late 1982 and 1983 under the pretext of plotting a coup. In late 1983, 101 military personnel appeared before a special military court at an undisclosed location, presided over by Judge Mohammad Reyshahri.

Several prominent figures were among the defendants:

- Captain Bahram Afzali: Commander of the Iranian Navy.
- Colonel Houshang Attarian: Commandaner of the Western Regional Headquarters and later special assistant to the Ministry of Defense.
- Colonel Bijan Kabiri: Commander of the special commando units (Green Berets), commander of the southern operations, and the officer responsible for breaking the siege of Abadan during the Iran–Iraq War.
- Colonel Hassan Azarfar: Professor at the Military Academy.
- Colonel Rahim Shams
- Colonel Seyfollah Ghiasvand
- Colonel Abolghasem Afraei

Despite extensive preparations, the trial did not proceed as smoothly as previous state trials. Some defendants retracted their signed confessions, while others heavily watered them down. A few even managed to make the public aware, mid-trial, that their wives or children had been detained. Afzali rejected the espionage charges. Lacking a defense attorney like the other defendants, he asked the judge to take over his defense because he himself was not well-versed in legal matters.

The court handed down unequal sentences: 10 people were sentenced to death, 6 to life imprisonment, 12 to prison terms ranging from 15 to 30 years, 19 to terms between 8 and 14 years, 8 up to seven years, 30 up to five years, and 13 to less than five years.

A group of those convicted, including the military branch of the party such as Captain Afzali, Colonel Attarian, Colonel Kabiri, and Colonel Azarfar, were executed in Evin Prison in March—specifically on February 26, 1984. (Witness account by Bijan Ghobadi: "A few hours before the execution, they gathered us in the Evin Husseinieh and brought them in. After some remarks, they took them away and executed them that very night. I am a living witness to that crime by the Tehran regime.")

An additional 19 individuals—including two whose sentences had already ended—were later executed alongside others during the 1988 mass executions. This group included Abbas Hajari, Manouchehr Behzadi, Mohammad-Ali Rasadi, Mohammad Pourhormozan, Mehdi Keyhan, Anoushirvan Ebrahimi, Farajollah Mizani, Asef Razmdideh, and Hossein Jodat.

In 1989, following the conclusion of the previous year's mass executions, the government permitted Reynaldo Galindo Pohl, the then-Special Representative of the United Nations Commission on Human Rights, to visit Evin Prison. During this visit, Kianouri spoke to Galindo Pohl from his cell about how he and his wife, Maryam Farman Farmaian, had been tortured to extract false, staged confessions, showing him his broken arm as proof. In his report, Pohl also wrote that Maryam Firouz had difficulty hearing, eating, and sitting due to being severely beaten a few years prior.

Akbar Hashemi Rafsanjani, a prominent figure in the government at the time, later stated in an interview with the Hamshahri newspaper that the crackdown on the Tudeh Party and the execution of its members would have been better left undone. In the interview, he remarked: "It would have been better if we hadn't done that (executing the Tudeh Party members). We had the Tudeh Party under surveillance. I found no evidence for the claim that they were planning a coup."

== See also ==
- British military network in Iran

== Bibliography ==
- Black Book on Tudeh Officers Organization [Ketab-e Siyah darbareh-e Sazman-e Afsaran-e Tudeh] (Translated ed.). Office of the Military Governor of Teheran. 2014 [1956]. ISBN 978-3844278132 – via epubli.
