= Iran is not just Tehran =

1940s Iranian political slogan

"Iran is not just Tehran" (Note: Persian: ایران فقط تهران نیست, romanized: Irân faqat Tehrân nist, IPA: [ʔiːˈɾɒːn fæˈɣætʰ tʰehˈɹɒːn ˈniːstʰ].) is a slogan coined by the Tudeh Party of Iran in the early 1940s, originally used to convey importance of the provinces and voice "regional grievance against the capital.”

== Later notable uses ==
- The phrase is used by Lonely Planet and other travel guiding sources to point that by local standards Tehran is a "virtually new" city and tourist attractions located elsewhere in Iran are more interesting.
- Gholam-Ali Haddad-Adel used the slogan to argue that 2009 Iranian presidential election was not fraudulent and Mahmoud Ahmadinejad has beaten Mir-Hossein Mousavi: "Does Mousavi know how many people voted for Ahmadinejad in the rural areas and in the villages? Iran is not just Tehran. We know that Mr Mousavi got 13 million votes, but Mr Ahmadinejad got 24 million".
- Following landslide victory of the reformist List of Hope in 2016 parliamentary election of Tehran electoral district, an editorial published by conservative newspaper Kayhan warned that "Iran is not just Tehran" and dismissed their success.
- Iran's culture minister, Abbas Salehi, used the phrase in his 2017 speech to emphasize capabilities and skills existing in cities other than Tehran: "We should see the provinces in the light of a more extended outlook and the motto, 'Iran is not just Tehran' is a fact, because there are ingenuities in the provinces that should be noticed".
