= Ali Khavari =

Iranian politician (1923–2021)

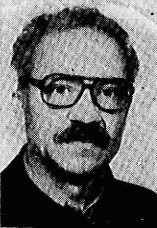
- Khavari in 1979
- Born: 1923; Mashhad, Qajar Iran
- Died: 19 March 2021 (aged 97); Berlin
- Political party: Tudeh Party

Ali Khavari (Persian: علی خاوری; 22 March 1923 – 19 March 2021) was an Iranian communist politician and First-Secretary of the Tudeh Party of Iran.

== Career ==
In 1984, he became First-Secretary of Tudeh Party of Iran, the party he joined in 1941. He was elected to the 'Central Committee' in the early 1960s, and on the eve of the 1979 revolution he was elected to the 'Political Committee' and the 'Secretariat of the Central Committee'.

Party political offices
Preceded by Noureddin Kianouri	First-Secretary of the Tudeh Party of Iran; 1984–2004	Vacant
