= Tudeh Youth Organization =

- Founded: 22 March 1943; 82 years ago
- Preceded by: Young Communist League of Persia
- Membership: ≈5,500 (1952)
- Ideology: Communism; Marxism–Leninism
- Mother party: Tudeh Party of Iran
- International affiliation: WFDY
- Newspaper: Razm
- Magazine: Mardom Baraye Javanan

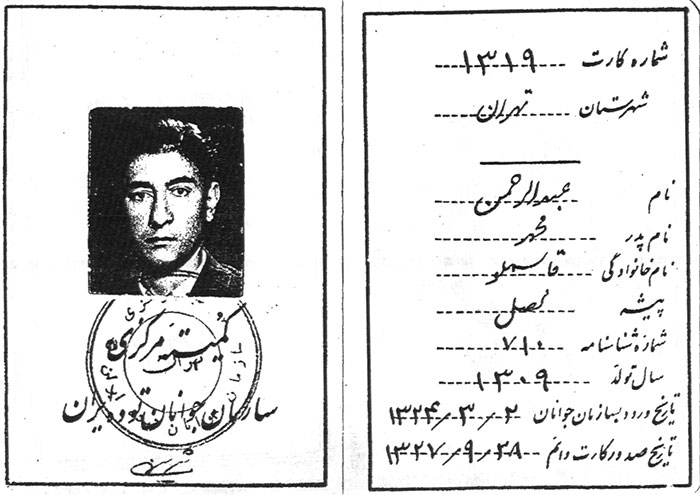
Tudeh Youth Membership Card

Tudeh Youth Organization (Persian: سازمان جوانان توده, romanized: Sāzmān-e javānān-e Tuda) is the youth wing of the Tudeh Party of Iran that was founded in 1943. The organization is affiliated with World Federation of Democratic Youth (WFDY).

It published Mardom Baraye Javanan (lit. 'People for the Youth') weekly and then Razm (lit. 'Combat') daily newspapers.

The organization was led by Reza Radmanesh, who was succeeded by Nader Sharmini from 1947 to 1952. Under the leadership of the latter, the organization proposed more radical slogans while siding with the moderate faction of the party and attacking the hardliner faction for being not enough revolutionary.

In 1966, a split occurred in the organization when a group of members left the party because they considered themselves Maoist. They subsequently founded an organization named the Revolutionary Organization of the Tudeh Party.
