= Akbar Schandermani =

Iranian communist politician (1917–1995)

- Born: 7 November 1917; Bandar Anzali, Sublime State of Iran
- Died: 29 August 1995 (aged 77); Moscow, Russia
- Occupations: Associate Professor for Persian Language and Literature
- Known for: He was one of the members of The Fifty-Three
- Political party: Tudeh Party of Iran

Akbar Schandermani (Persian: اکبر شاندرمنی; 7 November 1917 – 29 August 1995) was an Iranian communist politician. He was a member of The Fifty-Three and later the Tudeh Party of Iran.

== Biography ==
Akbar Schandermani was born in 1917 in Bandar-e Anzali, Iran. In 1937, as a supporter of the communist movement, he and other Iranian communists began their political struggle against the Iranian regime. That same year, he was arrested and put on trial along with 53 other Iranian communists. This trial became known as the Trial of the Fifty-Three, where 53 Iranians were arrested by the authorities for communist activities in 1937 and brought to trial in November 1938.

That same year, Akbar Schandarmani, along with other communists, was sentenced to three years in prison and imprisoned. He was released from prison in 1941 and continued his political activities. Although Iranian intelligence classified him as a communist, he joined the Iranian Communist Party, only in the year of its founding, in 1941. After joining the party, he was elected leader of its youth wing. In 1948, he was arrested again and sentenced to death. In 1950, he managed to escape from prison. He continued his activities underground.

In 1956, he fled Iran across the Turkmen border to the Soviet Union, where he sought political asylum. That same year, he received the status of political emigrant in USSR, where in his identity card he was classified as "professional revolutionary". A few months later, he was transferred to the GDR, where he was elected to the Politburo of the Tudeh Party of Iran in Leipzig. In 1958, he returned to Moscow, where he began his higher education at the Higher Party School of the Communist Party of the Soviet Union. Four years after completing his studies, he taught Persian language and literature at Moscow State University. In 1963, he moved to Dushanbe, Tajikistan, where he headed the Tudeh Party of Iran in the region. Alongside his party activities, he worked as an associate professor of Persian language and literature at the Tajik National University.

In 1979, after the overthrow of Mohammad Reza Pahlavi's regime, he returned to Iran and continued his political activities. In 1982–1983, when the Islamic Republic began repressing its political opponents, many communists were arrested and imprisoned. Akbar Schandermani managed to escape to the countryside, and later fled Iran across the Turkmen border to the Soviet Union. Akbar Schandermani died in Moscow in 1995, where he was buried in a cemetery in Moscow's Khamovniki District.
