= Laborers' Party of Iran =

Laborers' Party of Iran حزب رنجبران ایران
- Founded: 26 December 1979
- Merger of: 9 Marxist groups
- Split from: Tudeh Party of Iran
- Headquarters: Vällingby, Sweden
- Newspaper: Ranjbar
- Ideology: Marxism–Leninism; Maoism; Anti-imperialism
- Political position: Far-left
- International affiliation: ICMLPO (defunct); ICOR
- Slogan: Not America, Not Russia, an independent and self-reliant Iran

The Laborers' Party of Iran (Note: Alternatively translated "Party of Toilers" or "Toilers' Party", or as the "Party of Proletariat" or "Proletarian Party". It was formerly named Revolutionary Organization of the Tudeh Party.) (Persian: حزب رنجبران ایران, romanized: Ḥezb-e ranjbarān-e Īrān, lit. 'Party of the Toilers of Iran'), or simply Ranjbaran (Persian: رنجبران, romanized: Ranjbarān, lit. 'Toilers, Proletariat') is an Iranian Maoist political party in exile.

An advocate of the Three Worlds Theory, the party supported Abolhassan Banisadr and was banned in 1981.
