= Setare-ye Sorkh (1970s) =

- Categories: Political magazine
- Frequency: Monthly
- Founder: Revolutionary Organization of the Tudeh Party
- Founded: 1970
- Final issue: 1979
- Country: Italy
- Based in: Rome
- Language: Persian
- Website: iran-archive.com
- OCLC: 942771106

Setare-ye Sorkh (Persian: ستارهٔ سرخ, romanized: setāra-ye sorḵ, lit. 'Red Star') was an Iranian Maoist periodical publication that was published in Rome, Italy, in the early 1970s. It served as the official mouthpiece of the Revolutionary Organization of the Tudeh Party. The publication was headquartered in Rome, Italy.

The publication advocated the line that third-world countries were semi-feudal and semi-colonial, and recommended peasant revolution in the absence of an urban proletariat.
