= Revolutionary Republican Party of Iran =

Revolutionary Republican Party
- Leader: Taqī Arānī, Aḥmad Asadī, and Mortażā ʿAlawī
- Founded: late 1925
- Headquarters: Germany
- Ideology: Radicalism; Republicanism; Socialism
- Political position: Left-wing

The Revolutionary Republican Party of Iran (Persian: فرقه جمهوری انقلابی ایران, romanized: Ferqa-ye jomhūrī-e enqelābī-e Īrān) was a moderate left-wing political party in Persia with socialist reformist tendencies. It was founded in late 1925 by Iranian diaspora in Germany and published its platform in 1927.
