= Varak, Qazvin =

Varak ورک
- Village
- Location within Iran
- Coordinates: 36°22′51″N 50°41′19″E
- Country: Iran
- Province: Qazvin
- County: Qazvin
- Bakhsh: Rudbar-e Alamut
- Rural District: Alamut-e Pain

Population (2006)
  - Total: 82
- Time zone: UTC+3:30 (IRST)
  - Summer (DST): UTC+4:30 (IRDT)

Varak (Persian: ورک) is a village in Alamut-e Pain Rural District, Rudbar-e Alamut District, Qazvin County, Qazvin province, Iran. At the 2006 census, its population was 82, in 38 families.

== Notable residents ==
Noureddin Alamouti, Iranian Politician
