= Mohammad Bahrami =

Iranian politician (1898–1957)

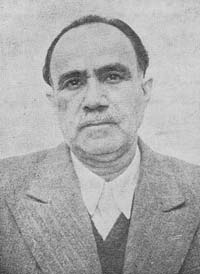
- Born: 1898; Tehran
- Died: 1957 (aged 58–59)
- Education: University of Berlin
- Occupation: Physician
- Political party: Tudeh Party of Iran; Communist Party of Germany

Mohammad Bahrami (Persian: محمد بهرامی, 1898–1957) was an Iranian communist politician. Bahrami belonged to the group of "fifty-three" and was a senior member of the Tudeh Party of Iran. He was a member of the executive committee of the party and served as the acting first-secretary during exile of Reza Radmanesh, when the party went underground. He was imprisoned in 1955 and released in 1957. Shortly after, he died from diabetes, which he suffered since the 1930s.

Party political offices
Preceded by Reza Radmanesh	First Secretary of the Tudeh Party of Iran; Acting; 1949–1953	Succeeded by Reza Radmanesh
Preceded by Soleiman Eskandari as Chairman	Co-General-Secretary of the Tudeh Party of Iran; 1944–1948; Served alongside: Iraj Eskandari and Noureddin Alamouti	Succeeded by Reza Radmanesh as First Secretary
