= National Union Party (Iran) =

National Union Party حزب اتحاد ملی
- Founded: 1944
- Dissolved: 1944
- Newspaper: Nedaye Mellat
- Ideology: Royalism; Social conservatism Mixed economy Anti-communism
- Political position: Centrism

National Union Party (Persian: حزب اتحاد ملی, romanized: Ḥezb-e Ettehād-e Mellī) was a royalist party in Iran, established as an offshoot of the fraction of the same name in the Iranian Parliament.

The party advocated supporting the Shah and pursuing social conservative programs, while seeking American aid, especially military aid to counterbalance the influence of Britain and Soviet Union.

With a conservative background, the party spoke on advantages of socialism and renamed itself to People's Party in August 1944 to challenge the Tudeh Party of Iran.
