= Abdolsamad Kambakhsh =

Iranian communist activist (1902/1903–1971)

- عبدالصمد کامبخش
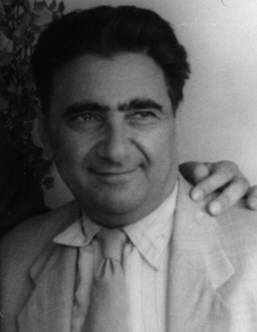

Member of Parliament of Iran
- In office 6 March 1944 – 12 March 1946
- Constituency: Qazvin

Personal details
- Born: Abdolsamad Adle Qajar; 1902 or 1903 Qazvin, Sublime State of Iran
- Died: November 10, 1971 Leipzig, East Germany
- Party: Tudeh Party (1943–1971); Communist Party of Persia (1920s)
- Other political affiliations: Communist International (Comintern)
- Spouse: Dr. Akhtar Kianouri
- Relatives: Noureddin Kianouri (brother-in-law)
- Education: Moscow State University (MSU)
- Nickname: Red Prince

Military service
- Branch/service: Air Force
- Years of service: 1932–1937
- Rank: Second lieutenant

Abdolsamad Kambakhsh (Persian: عبدالصمد کامبخش, romanized: ʿAbd-ul-Ṣamad Kāmbaḵš, birth name Abdolsamad Adle Qajar; 1902 or 1903 – 1971) son of Prince Kamran Mirza Adle Qajar, also known by his aliases as Abdolsamad Qanbari or the Red Prince, was an Iranian communist political activist. In early 1925, he married feminist activist Dr. Akhtar Kianouri (Persian: اختر کیانوری). Noureddin Kianouri, the younger brother of Dr. Akhtar Kianouri, grew up in their house.

== Early years ==
He grew up in his birthplace, and went to study in Russia in 1915. There he got inspired by the Russian Revolution. When he returned to Iran, he joined the Socialist and Communist parties. He then resided in Tehran and became a factory manager. Despite his political leanings, the Iranian government granted him a scholarship in 1927 and he was sent to the Soviet Union for studies. At Moscow University, he studied aeronautics between 1928 and 1932.

He was the first and only Iranian member of Communist International (Comintern). He represented Tudeh in the 22nd Congress of the Communist Party of the Soviet Union.

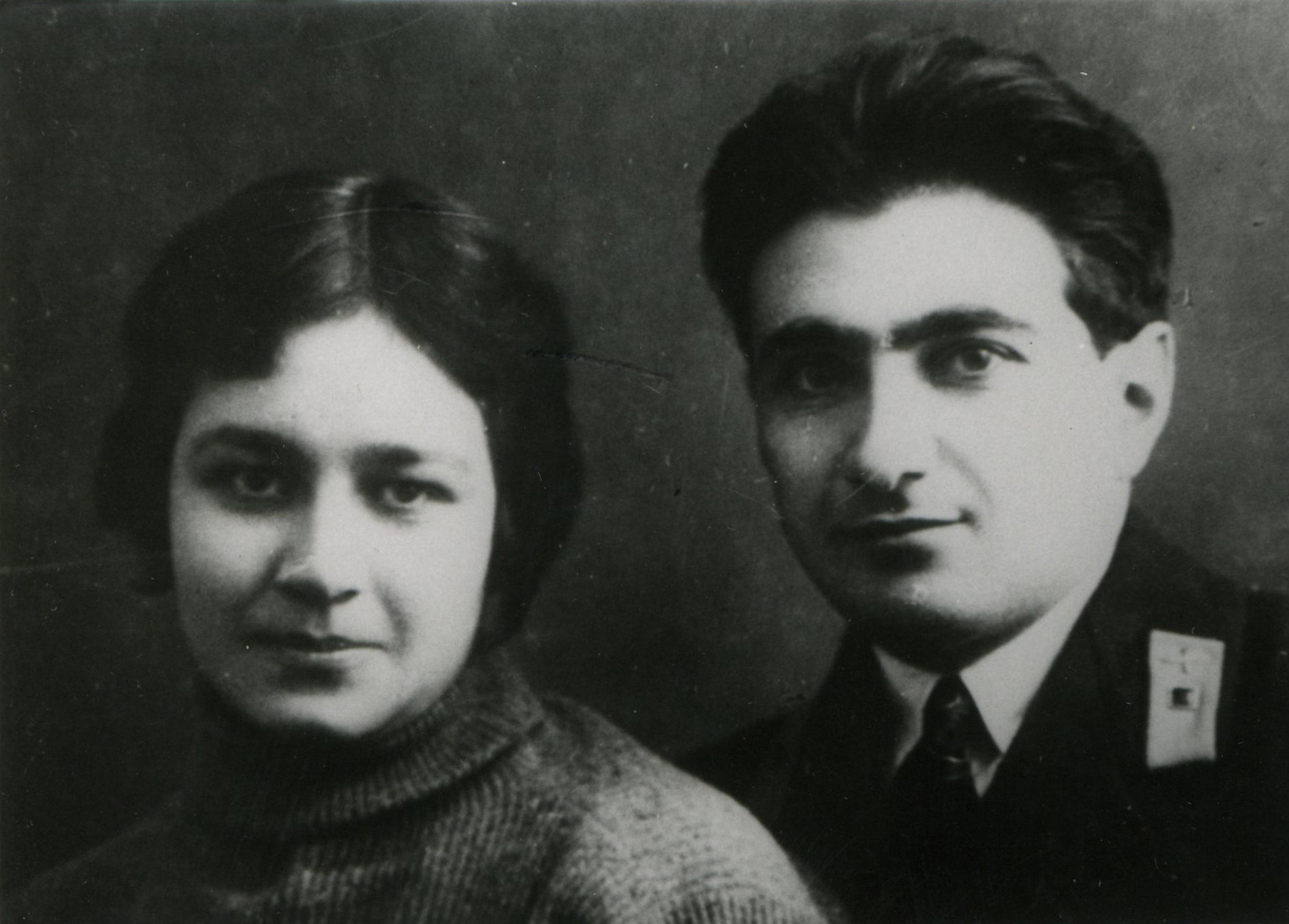
Kambakhsh and his wife Akhtar Kianouri after returning from Russia

According to the CIA, Abdossamad Kambakhsh was the founder of Tudeh Party and Azerbaijan Movement. For Russia, he was the Iranian representative in Communist International (Comintern) and therefore an ally. That made him the "Voice of Russia" for Iranians.

== Political life ==
Kambakhshwas an influential member of the Tudeh Party of Iran and belonged to the party's hardline faction. He was also one of the few “group of fifty-three” with experience in the youth section of the Communist party, where he helped organizing the local educational society. At the time of his arrest in 1937, Kabakhsh was an instructor in engineering at the military academy and the manager of the army mechanics school outside Tehran. The contacts he made in these years, proved highly useful later when the Tudeh decided to form cells within the military.

In the introduction of Kambakhsh's book the Workers’ and Communist Movement in Iran, Ehsan Tabari named him the only Iranian who was trusted by Joseph Stalin and the Soviets. Kambakhsh was known for his close connections to the Soviet intelligence agencies, including the OGPU, the NKVD and the KGB.

Scholar Maziar Behrooz argues that "Kambakhsh was not a theorist but a party functionary with strong personal connections to the Soviets".

According to written statements of Khosro Rouzbeh in military court, Kambakhsh initiated the activities of Tudeh Military Network in early 1944.

In the first congress of Tudeh held in August 1944, Kambakhsh was elected to the central committee.

After the 1946 Azerbaijan revolt, he was prosecuted with a warrant and as a result he fled the country. The military tribunal sentenced him to death in absentia, forcing him into exile until his death.

== Bibliography ==
- A Review of the Workers 'and Communist Movement in Iran: A Collection of Articles by Kambakhsh, Abdolsamad, 1350-1282. (Nazari Beh Jonbeshi Kargari va Komunist-i dar Iran) in two cover, first cover in 290 Pages. The first volume of the books Social democracy = 310 p - y 14 - Kambakhsh (PDF) (in Persian). is about the only organized resistance against the pro-Hitler coalition and regime during the Reza Shah era.
- The October Revolution and Liberation Movements in Iran
- Fifty Years of the Proletarian Party in Iran
- Reminiscences on the Educational Society in Qazvin
- Reflections on the History of the Tudeh (Communist) Party
- The Formation of the Tudeh (Left) Party
- The Tudeh Party in the Struggle to Create a Democratic United
- Notes on the History of the Iranian Army
- History of the Azerbaijan Movement
- The failure of the movement in Azerbaijan and Kurdistan
- History of the Khorasan Movement
- the Revolutionary Social Democracy in the Persian Constitutional Revolution
- History of the Tudeh Party of Iran
- From the beginning till the second congress of Tudeh Party of Iran
- About the Second Congress of Party of Iran (Urmia Congress)
- Tudeh Party of Iran - The Age of Public Struggle
- From the formation of the Tudeh Party of Iran till the first congress
- From the first state conference to the first congress of Tudeh Party of Iran
- First Party Congress of Tudeh Party of Iran
- From the first party congress to the Azerbaijani movement
- The failure of the movement in Azerbaijan and Kurdistan
- End of open public activity for Tudeh Party of Iran
- The Tudeh Party of Iran's struggle against imperialism and internal reaction in private
- About the activities of the Revolutionary Social Democracy and the Communist Party of Iran
- The role of the Tudeh Party of Iran in the history of the liberation movement of our homeland
- The Tudeh Party of Iran in the struggle to form a united national and democratic front
- A glimpse of the history of the Iranian army and the democratic struggles within it
- Certificate of a life history
- Volume 2 of the book The Iranian Workers' and Communist Movement, Dr. Kambakhsh Encyclopedia (untranslated into German and Russian)

Party political offices
Preceded by Iraj Eskandari	Second Secretary of the Tudeh Party of Iran; 1969–1971	Succeeded by Noureddin Kianouri
Preceded by Ardeshir Ovanessian as Caretaker	Secretary-in-Charge of the Tudeh Military Network; 1944–1946	Succeeded by Noureddin Kianouri
