= Soleiman Eskandari =

Iranian Qajar prince, and socialist politician (1875–1944)

- سلیمان اسکندری
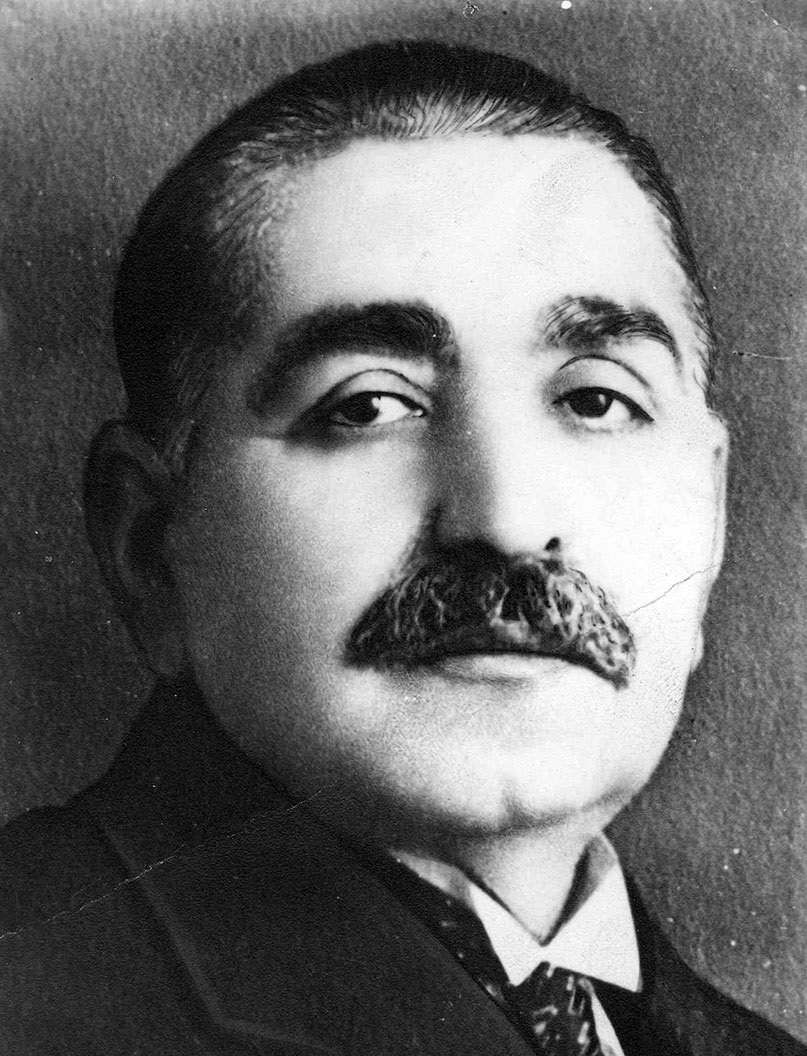

Member of the Parliament
- In office 11 February 1924 – 11 February 1926
- Monarchs: Reza Shah; Ahmad Shah Qajar
- Constituency: Tehran
- In office 22 June 1921 – 11 June 1923
- Monarch: Ahmad Shah Qajar
- Constituency: Tehran
- In office 6 December 1914 – 13 November 1915
- Monarch: Ahmad Shah Qajar
- Constituency: Isfahan
- In office 15 November 1909 – 25 December 1911
- Monarch: Ahmad Shah Qajar
- Constituency: Tehran

Minister of Education
- In office October 1923 – February 1924
- Prime Minister: Reza Khan
- Preceded by: Mohammad-Hassan Loghman-Azam
- Succeeded by: Nezamoddin Hekmat(Acting)

Personal details
- Born: Soleiman Mirza Qajar; 1875
- Died: 7 January 1944 (aged 68–69)
- Resting place: Imamzadeh Abdullah, Rey
- Party: Tudeh Party (1941–44); Socialist Party (1921–27); Democrat Party (1909–19)
- Relatives: Mohammad Mosaddegh (cousin)

Soleiman Mirza Eskandari (Persian: سلیمان میرزا اسکندری; 1875 – 7 January 1944) was an Iranian Qajar prince and socialist politician. A civil servant and constitutionalist activist, he served as a member of parliament for four consecutive terms and briefly served as the education minister (mo'āref). During his career, Eskandari was associated with Democrat, Socialist and Tudeh parties. In the aftermath of the Anglo-Soviet invasion of Iran during World War II, the Soviet Union was occupying an area in the north of the country that included the capital of Tehran and took advantage of this position by fostering the creation of the communist Tudeh party under the leadership of Eskandari.

Assembly seats
Preceded by Nasrollah Taghavi	1st Vice Speaker of Parliament of Iran; 1915	Succeeded by Hossein Adl
Party political offices
New title Party founded	Chairman of the Tudeh Party of Iran; 1941–1944	Succeeded by Mohammad Bahrami
New title Party founded	Chairman of the Tudeh Party of Iran; 1941–1944	Succeeded by Noureddin Alamouti
New title Party founded	Chairman of the Tudeh Party of Iran; 1941–1944	Succeeded by Iraj Eskandari as General-Secretaries
New title	Parliamentary leader of the Socialists; 1924–1926; 1921–1923	Vacant Party dissolved
Preceded by Hassan Taqizadeh	Parliamentary leader of the Democrats; 1914–1915; 1909–1911	Vacant Party dissolved
