= Fereydoun Keshavarz =

Iranian physician and communist politician

- فریدون کشاورز

Minister of Culture
- In office 1 August 1946 – 16 October 1946
- Prime Minister: Ahmad Qavam
- Preceded by: Mohammad-Taqi Bahar
- Succeeded by: Ali Shayegan

Member of Parliament of Iran
- In office 7 March 1944 – 12 March 1946
- Constituency: Anzali Port

Personal details
- Born: 31 August 1907 Anzali Port, Iran
- Died: 6 October 2006 (aged 99) Switzerland
- Party: Tudeh Party (1941–1958)
- Spouse: Khadijeh Keshavarz
- Education: University of Toulouse

Fereydoun Keshavarz (Persian: فریدون کشاورز; 1907–2006) was an Iranian physician and communist politician.

== Early life and education ==
The son of a merchant from Gilan who had taken part in the Persian Constitutional Revolution, Keshavarz studied in Dar ul-Funun before going to study medicine in France. He taught at University of Tehran after he returned to Iran.

== Career ==
Keshavarz entered politics in 1941, and joined Tudeh Party of Iran three months after its creation. A leading member of the party, he was elected to its first central committee and served as the party's parliamentary spokesperson. In the summer of 1946 he was named a minister in Qavam's coalition cabinet. He broke away from the party in 1958, because he came to believe that "Tudeh's policy is a betrayal of the working class".

Party political offices
New title	Spokesperson of the Tudeh fraction 1944–1946	Vacant
