= Tudeh fraction =

Group in Iranian Parliament

- Chamber: Iranian Parliament
- Foundation: 1944
- Member parties: Tudeh Party of Iran
- President: Reza Radmanesh (1944–1946)
- Spokesperson: Fereydoun Keshavarz (1944–1946)

The Tudeh fraction (Persian: فراکسیون توده) was the parliamentary group of the Tudeh Party in the Iranian Parliament.

The group was known for its robust discipline, and its ability to dominate debates in the parliament. During the 14th Iranian Majlis, the party formed a left-center coalition with deputies (mostly from northern provinces) who sympathized with its policies, gaining a voting strength of about 30.

== Historical membership ==
Years	Seats	Change	Ref
1944–1946	8 / 136	Steady	
1947–1949	2 / 136	▼6	
