= Ardeshir Ovanessian =

Iranian communist politician (1905–1990)

Ardashir Ovanessian
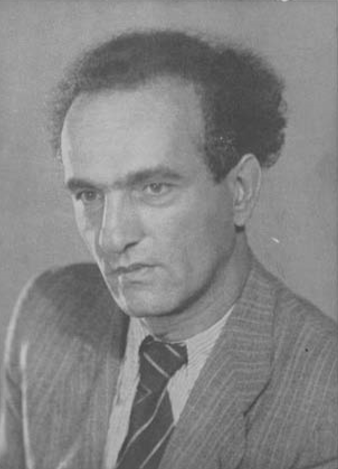

Member of Parliament of Iran
- In office 7 March 1944 – 12 March 1946
- Constituency: Armenians (North)

Personal details
- Born: Ardashes Ovanessian; 1905 Rasht, Qajar Iran
- Died: 1990 (aged 84–85) Yerevan, Armenian SSR
- Party: Tudeh Party of Iran
- Other political affiliations: Communist Party of Persia
- Education: KUTV

Ardeshir Ovanessian (Persian: اردشیر آوانسیان; 1905–1990) was an Iranian communist leader of Armenian origin.

== Biography ==
He was born around 1905 in Rasht, to an Armenian family originally hailing from Salmas. After completing a pharmacist apprenticeship (the profession of his father), he became involved in radical politics. He became involved in the radical Cultural Society of Rasht. Ovanessian became a cadre of the Communist Party of Persia in 1923. In 1925, he was sent to study at KUTV. Upon his return in 1926 he organized a pharmacists' trade union. For the Communist Party Ovanessian played a key role in the organizing of the party in Azerbaijan, making frequent visits to the different towns in the region.

Ovanessian was eventually captured by the police, and would spend eleven years in Qasr prison. In prison, Ovanessian played a major role. He and other jailed communist leaders organized cultural and educational activities for other inmates. In jail, Ovanessian studied French language. Once released in 1941, he became a founding member of the Tudeh Party of Iran. He became a member of the Provisional Central Committee of the party. After his release, he published a self-biographical work of his prison ordeals.

He was elected to the 14th Majlis in 1944, as a representative of the Armenian minority. He presided over the Tudeh Party congress held in August the same year. Ovanessian was elected to the Central Committee of the Tudeh Party. He was one of two former members of the old Persian Communist Party to be included in the Central Committee (the other being Amir-Khizi). He also became a leading figure in the Tudeh-led trade union movement.

Ovanessian organized a peasant uprising in Azerbaijan in 1945. Police later claimed to have found documents in Tehran, indicating that he was preparing an anti-government conspiracy. Ovanessian fled to Rasht. He became Director-General of the Azerbaijan People's Government. When the Azerbaijan People's Government fell, he went into exile in the Soviet Union. On 18 May 1949, he was sentenced to death in absentia by an Iranian court.
