= Reza Radmanesh =

Iranian politician and physicist (1905/06–1983)

Member of Parliament of Iran
- In office 7 March 1944 – 12 March 1946
- Constituency: Lahijan

Personal details
- Born: 1905 or 1906 Lahijan, Sublime State of Iran
- Died: 1983 (aged 77–78) Leipzig, East Germany
- Party: Tudeh Party of Iran
- Other political affiliations: Socialist Party (1920s)
- Relatives: Mohammad Ali Mojtahedi (cousin)
- Education: University of Paris

Reza Radmanesh (Persian: رضا رادمنش; 1905/06–1983) was an Iranian physicist, communist politician and general secretary of the Tudeh Party of Iran. According to Abbas Milani, he was "one of the most prominent members of the Iranian communist movement".

== Early life and education ==
Radmanesh was born into a Gilak landed upper-class family. He helped the local Jangalis as a teenager; and joined the Socialist Party while he studied at Dar ul-Funun. He went to France to study physics, and met Taghi Arani, before he returned to Iran as a junior member of The Fifty-Three. He was sentenced to five years of imprisonment.

== Career ==
Radmanesh was a leading and dominating personality in the Tudeh Party of Iran, serving as a member of the party's central committee, head of its youth wing and its parliamentary leader before taking office as the first Secretary in 1948.

Party political offices
Preceded by Mohammad Bahrami	First Secretary of the Tudeh Party of Iran; 1948–1969; Served alongside: Mohammad Bahrami (1949–1953) as Acting First-Secretary	Succeeded by Iraj Eskandari
Preceded by Noureddin Alamouti	First Secretary of the Tudeh Party of Iran; 1948–1969; Served alongside: Mohammad Bahrami (1949–1953) as Acting First-Secretary	Succeeded by Iraj Eskandari
Preceded by Iraj Eskandari as General-Secretaries	First Secretary of the Tudeh Party of Iran; 1948–1969; Served alongside: Mohammad Bahrami (1949–1953) as Acting First-Secretary	Succeeded by Iraj Eskandari
New title	Head of Tudeh fraction 1944–1946	Vacant
New title	Head of Tudeh Youth Organization; 1943–1947	Succeeded by Nader Sharmini
