= The Fifty-Three =

Group of Iranian political prisoners

The Fifty-Three was a group of 53 Iranians arrested for involvement in communist political activities in 1937 and brought to trial in November 1938 in the most sensational of the political trials held during the reign of Reza Shah Pahlavi. Some, such as Taqi Arani, died in jail—the rest were released in 1941.

The 53 Iranians arrested were:

1. Taqi Arani
2. Abdul-Samad Kambakhsh
3. Mohammad Bahrami
4. Mohammad Shureshyan
5. Ali Sadeqpour
6. Mohammad Boqrati
7. Ziya Alamutti
8. Mohammad Pazhuh
9. Mohammad Farjami
10. Abbas Azeri
11. Nasratallah Ezazi
12. Anvar Khamei
13. Nosrat-ollah Jahanshahlou
14. Emad Alamutti
15. Akbar Afshar
16. Taqi Makinezhad
17. Mojtaba Sajjadi
18. Bozorg Alavi
19. Mehdi Rasai
20. Iraj Eskandari
21. Morteza Yazdi
22. Reza Radmanesh
23. Khalil Maleki
24. Morteza Sajjadi
25. Hossein Sajjadi
26. Akbar Schandermani
27. Mohammad Qodreh
28. Taqi Shahin
29. Morteza Razavi
30. Seyfollah Sayyah
31. Alinqali Hokmi
32. Ezatollah Etiqechi
33. Vali Khajavi
34. Rahim Alamutti
35. Shayban Zamani
36. Abdul-Qassem Ashtari
37. Hossein Tarbiyat
38. Fazollah Garkani
39. Yousef Soqfi
40. Jalal Naini
41. Rajbali Nasimi
42. Bahman Shomali
43. Mehdi Laleh
44. Ehsan Tabari
45. Abbas Naraqi
46. Mehdi Daneshvar
47. Hassan Habibi
48. Noureddin Alamouti
49. Reza Ibrahimzadeh
50. Khalel Enqelab
51. Fereydun Manou
52. Ana Turkoman
53. Razi Hakim-Allahi

tudeh party
