= Mostafa Fateh =

Iranian economist and politician

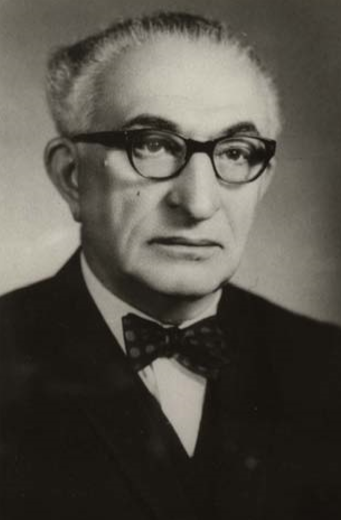
- Born: 20 February 1896; Isfahan, Persia
- Died: 30 August 1978 (aged 82); London, United Kingdom
- Education: Columbia University
- Employer: Anglo-Iranian Oil Company
- Political party: Comrades Party

Mostafa Fateh (Persian: مصطفی فاتح, romanized: Moṣṭafā Fāteḥ) was an Iranian economist and socialist politician who led the Comrades Party in the 1940s.

From 1921 to 1951, Fateh served in the Anglo-Iranian Oil Company (APOC) and is noted as the company's highest-ranking Iranian employee for decades.

Business positions
New title Bank established	Chairman of board of directors of the Tehran Bank; 1952–1976	Vacant Bank dissolved
Unknown	Deputy Director-General of the Anglo-Iranian Oil Company; 1947–1951	Unknown
Party political offices
New title Party established	Leader of the Comrades Party; 1942–1947	Vacant Party dissolved
