= Khavar-e no =

- Khavar-e no, December 21, 1944 issue
- Type: Daily
- Publisher: Tudeh Party of Iran
- Editor: Mahmud Torabi
- Founded: 1943
- Ceased publication: 1945
- Political alignment: Communism
- Language: Persian
- Headquarters: Tabriz

Khavar-e no (Persian: خاور نو, lit. 'New East') was an Iranian Persian-language daily newspaper, published from Tabriz 1943 to 1945. Mahmud Torabi was the editor of the paper. Khavar-e no was founded as the regional organ of the Tudeh Party after the expulsion from the party of Ali Shabistari, the editor of the erstwhile Tudeh newspaper in the region, Azerbaijan. Shabistari had been expelled on the grounds of promoting Azeri nationalism. Khavar-e no was published with support from the Soviet Union.
