= Taqi Arani =

Iranian political activist (1903–1940)

- تقی ارانی
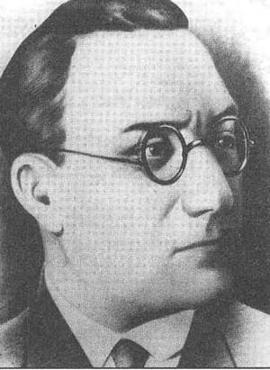
- Born: 5 September 1903; Tabriz, Sublime State of Persia
- Died: 4 February 1940 (aged 36); Tehran, Imperial State of Iran
- Education: Technische Universität Berlin
- Occupations: Chemist, teacher, author
- Criminal charge: Marxist sedition

Taqi Arani (Persian: تقی ارانی; 5 September 1903 – 4 February 1940), was a professor of chemistry, left-wing Iranian political activist and theorist as well as the founder and editor of the Marxist magazine Donya (The World). The magazine's main aim was to introduce Marxism to Iranians and to provide a basis for a prospective Marxist group.

== Biography ==
Arani was born in Tabriz and moved to Tehran with his family when he was four years old. In 1920, he graduated from Dar ul-Funun School in Tehran and pursued his studies in Germany studying chemistry at the Technische Hochschule in Charlottenburg (now Technische Universität Berlin). While studying in Germany, he began to study politics as well. Upon finishing his studies, he returned to Iran in 1928 and started Donya magazine. Many people consider Donya as his most important contribution to modern intellectual life in Iran. In 1938, he and 52 of his colleagues, The Fifty-Three, were arrested and charged with involvement in communist activities. He died (or as some claim, was killed) in jail on 4 February 1940.

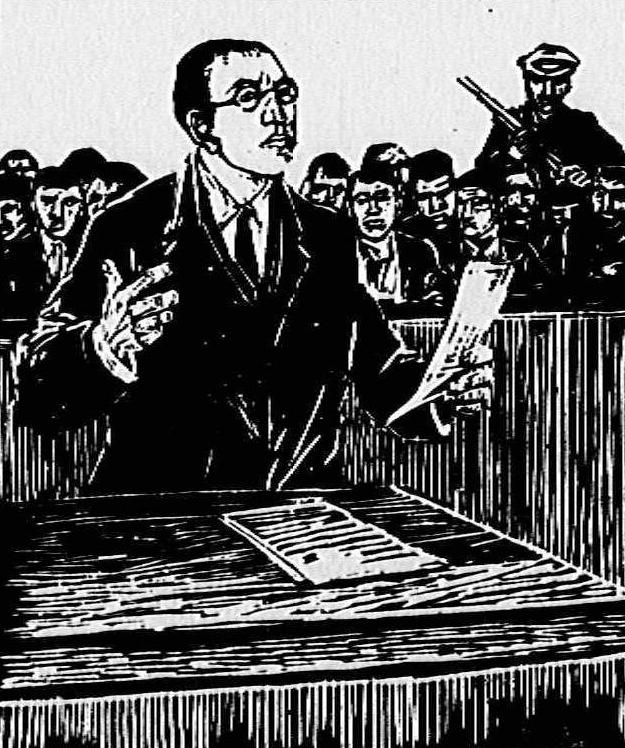
Illustration of Taqi Arani during his trial

Members of the Fifty-Three would go on to found the Tudeh Party in 1941, often considered the beginning of the modern Communist party in Iran.

== Views ==
Although an important figure in the history of Iran's Marxist Left, Arani held strong Iranian nationalist and chauvinistic leanings early in his career and wrote on the Iranian character of Iran's Azerbaijan region in response to pan-Turkist groups in Turkey of the 1920s. He also argued that the state should be reestablished based on the principles of the centralised Sassanian state.

Arani was also a supporter of the Jewish community against antisemitism. He wrote about the rise of the Nazi party in Germany "Only a deviant could accept that a Jew is less talented than a German". Tudeh party took firm stances against Germany during the second world war, Its flagship organ "Rahbar" wrote that "Hitler can not be pardoned".
