= Tudeh Party of Iran =

Marxist–Leninist political party in Iran

Tudeh Party of Iran حزب توده ایران
- Abbreviation: TPI, HTI
- International Secretary: Navid Shomali
- Spokesperson: Mohammad Omidvar
- Founders: The Fifty-Three
- Founded: 2 October 1941; 85 years ago
- Banned: 5 February 1949; 77 years ago (by the Imperial State); February 1983; 43 years ago (by the Islamic Republic)
- Preceded by: Communist Party of Persia
- Headquarters: Berlin, Germany; London, England; Leipzig, GDR (1949–1979); Tehran, Iran (1943–1983)
- Newspaper: Name-ye Mardom; Mardom; Rahbar (1942–1945); Khavar-e no (1943–1945)
- Youth wing: SJT
- Women's wing: Democratic Organization of Iranian Women
- Military wing: Officers' Organization
- Parliamentary wing: Tudeh fraction
- Worker wing: CCUTU
- Ideology: Communism; Marxism–Leninism; Left-wing nationalism Historical: Stalinism
- Political position: Far-left
- National affiliation: UFPP (1946–1948)
- International affiliation: IMCWP
- Colors: Dark Red; Black
- Slogan: “Iran is not just Tehran”
- Anthem: Anthem for Tudeh (composed by Parviz Mahmoud)

Website
- www.tudehpartyiran.org

The Tudeh Party of Iran (Note: Persian: حزب توده‌ی ایران, romanized: Hezbe Tudeye Irân, IPA: [ˈhezbe t̪ʰuːˈd̪eje ʔiːˈɾɒːn]; lit. 'Party of the Masses of Iran') is an Iranian Marxist–Leninist party. Formed in 1941 with Soleiman Mirza Eskandari as its leader, the organization held significant influence in its early years and played an important role during Mohammad Mosaddegh's campaign to nationalize the Anglo-Persian Oil Company, as well as throughout his term as prime minister. From the Iran crisis of 1946 onwards, Tudeh became a pro-Soviet organization and remained prepared to carry out the dictates of the Soviet leadership in Moscow, even if it meant sacrificing Iranian political independence and sovereignty. The crackdown that followed the 1953 coup against Mosaddegh is said to have "destroyed" the party, although a small part of it survived. The party still exists but has remained much weaker on account of being banned in Iran and mass arrests by the Islamic Republic in 1982, as well as the executions of political prisoners in 1988. Tudeh identified itself as the historical successor of the Communist Party of Persia.

== Ideological profile ==
The Tudeh Party is retroactively described in conflicting ways, sometimes as "Stalinist", or as a more traditional communist party that supported the Soviet Union while also adopting nationalism to appeal more to Iranians. It is also sometimes described simply as "leftist" or even "left-leaning" by other sources.

== History ==
=== Birth of the communist movement in Iran ===
The history of the communist movement in Iran dates back to the late 19th century, when Marxism was first introduced to the nation's intellectual and working classes as a result of the rapid growth of industry and the subsequent transformation of the country's economy from a feudalistic system into a capitalistic one. Being close to the Soviet Union and the Caucasus, northern Iran became the primary center of underground Marxist and social democrat political activity, and many such groups came into being over the years.

The Communist Party of Iran was founded in June 1920 in Bandar-e Anzali, in the province of Gilan, as a result of the first congress of Iranian social democrats. Haydar Khan Amo-oghli, who was one of the leaders of the Constitutional Revolution of Iran, became the national secretary of the new party. At the same time, Mirza Kuchik Khan, another major leader of the Constitutional Revolution and also the leader of the revolutionary Jungle "Jangali" Movement (Foresters' Movement), established the Socialist Soviet Republic of Gilan with the assistance of the Red Army of the Soviet Union.

With the defeat of both the newly formed Soviet Republic of Gilan and the Communist Party, communist and social democrat activity once again went underground. In the early 1920s the Qajar dynasty finally collapsed, and Reza Shah ascended to the throne in 1925, establishing the Pahlavi dynasty. The new Shah introduced many reforms, such as limiting the power of the Shia clergy, but also in turn established an authoritarian dictatorship.

In 1929–30, the party organized strikes in an Isfahan textile mill, the Mazandaran railways, Mashhad carpet workshops, and most importantly, in the British-owned oil industry. The government cracked down heavily and circa 200 communists were arrested; 38 were incarcerated in Qasr Prison in Tehran. Along with the Stalin purges, which took a heavy toll on Iranian communist exiles living in the Soviet Union, these arrests meant the Communist Party of Iran "ceased to exist for all practical purposes outside the walls of Qasr."

=== Foundation of the Tudeh Party ===
The British-Soviet Allied invasion of 1941–42 resulted in the end of Reza Shah's reign and his forced exile to South Africa. Many political prisoners subsequently received general amnesty by his son and successor Mohammad Reza Pahlavi, and under this new atmosphere, nationalist and socialist groups once again flourished. Members of the Marxist "Group of the 53 members" comprised a portion of these political prisoners. In Iran's post-Reza Shah era, the latter became a component of Soviet strategy, interests, and plans. Following their release, some of the "Group of the 53 members" including Iraj Iskandari met with a Soviet representative at the residence of Soleiman Eskandari to form the Hezb-e Tudeh-ye Iran ("the Party of Iranian masses"), a Marxist–Leninist party appealing to the broad masses. They founded the Tudeh party on 29 September 1941, electing Soleiman Eskandari as party president.

Initially the party was intended to be "a liberal rather than a radical party", with a platform stressing the importance of "constitutional" and "individual rights", protecting "democracy" and "judicial integrity" from fascism, imperialism, and militarism. "At Soleiman Eskandari's urging", the party initially attempted to appeal to non-secular masses by barring women from membership, organizing Moharram processions, and designating "a special prayer room in its main clubhouse." This orientation did not last and the party moved "rapidly to the left" within months of its founding.

=== Early peak ===
In 1944, the party entered the 14th Majlis elections and eight of its candidates were elected. It also established the secret Tudeh Party Military Organization of Iran, or TPMO (Sazman-e Nezami-ye Hezb-e Tudeh-ye Iran) made up of officers in the military. The TPMO provided the party with intelligence and information from the military to protect it from the security forces and give it military strength, though historians believe the party had no plan at that time to use the TPMO to stage a coup.

At the same time, Tudeh took a strong stand in favor of women's rights, starting in 1943. This included advocating for equal pay for equal work, two months of maternity leave for female workers and otherwise standing for women's social rights, working with those who had been fighting for these goals for years and were socialist. Even so, issues of reproduction, sexuality, and other elements within family life were not discussed.

From this point on the party grew immensely and became a major force in Iranian politics. By early 1945, the party had managed to create the first mass organization in Iran's history. Police records later revealed it had an estimated 2,200 hard-core members – 700 of them in Tehran – "10,000s of sympathizers in its youth and women's organizations, and 100,000s of sympathizers in its labor and craft unions." Its main newspaper, Rahbar (Leader), boasted a circulation of more than 100,000 – triple that of the "semi-official newspaper" Ettela'at. British ambassador Reader Bullard called it the only coherent political force in the country, and The New York Times reckoned it and its allies could win as much as 40% of the vote in a fair election.

This period has been called the height of the party's intellectual influence which came in large part from the prestige and propaganda of the Soviet Union as "the world's most progressive nation." Few intellectuals "dared oppose" the party "even if they did not join." Marking the end of the "near hegemony of the party over intellectual life" in Iran was the resignation from the party of celebrated writer Jalal Al-e-Ahmad c. 1948 to form a socialist splinter group – Third Force – in protest against the Tudeh's "nakedly pro-Soviet" policies.

Tarnishing the appeal of the Tudeh in 1944–1946 were Soviet demands for a petroleum concession in northern Iran and the Soviet sponsoring of ethnic revolts in Kurdestan and Azerbaijan. Despite the fact that Tudeh deputies in the Majles had previously vigorously demanded the nationalization of the whole petroleum industry, the Tudeh party supported granting the Soviet petroleum industry in Iran its wishes on grounds of "socialist solidarity", "internationalism," and "anti-imperialism."

From the Iran crisis of 1946 onwards, Tudeh became a pro-Soviet organization and remained prepared to carry out the dictates of the Kremlin, even if it meant sacrificing Iranian political independence and sovereignty. Based on increasingly available archival material from Russia, Iranologist Soli Shahvar contends that this was true much earlier—dating back to the Tudeh Party's inception, not just during the Fourteenth Majlis election campaign.

==== International Cold War context ====
During this time the rest of the international communist movement was also thriving. The communist world expanded dramatically in the decade following World War II with Eastern Europe, China, North Korea, and Vietnam all becoming states dominated by their respective communist parties, usually via military victory. In the United States, Iran was seen as the holder of reserves of petroleum with "vital strategic" value to western countries, and as part of "a Northern Tier" of countries (along with Greece and Turkey) that constituted a geopolitical "first line of defense" for the Mediterranean and for Asia, To counter the activities of the USSR, the CIA established Operation TPBEDAMN in the late 1940s, funded at $1 million a year. It prepared both "disguised (`gray` propaganda) or deliberately misrepresented black propaganda" in the form of "newspaper articles, cartoons, leaflets, and books" which it translated into Persian, most of which "portrayed the Soviet Union and the Tudeh as anti-Iranian or anti-Islamic, described the harsh reality of life in the Soviet Union, or explained the Tudeh's close relationship with the Soviets and its popular-front strategy." In addition, it paid "right-wing nationalist organizations" and some Shia religious figures. Its agents provoked "violent acts" and blamed them on the communists, and hired "thugs to break up Tudeh rallies."

Nonetheless, for three months in 1946, the Cabinet included three ministers who were Tudeh members and the party was able to fill the streets of Tehran and Abadan "with tens of thousands of enthusiastic demonstrators" for May Day in 1946.

=== 1949 crackdown ===
In February 1949, there was an attempt on the life of Shah Mohammad Reza Pahlavi. The party was blamed by the government and banned. The government "confiscated its assets, dissolved affiliated organizations, especially the Central Council and rounded up some 200 leaders and cadres."

The party continued to function underground however and by 1950 it had organized its supporters under the banner of the Iran Society for Peace (Jam'iyat-e Irani-ye Havadar-e Solh) and was publishing three daily papers, Razm, Mardom, and Besui-ye Ayandeh. In December 1950, the TPMO, its military organization, managed "to arrange for the escape of key members of the party leadership who had been in jail since early 1949."

Such suppression was assisted by conservatives detesting the Tudeh Party, which was later outlawed and allied with Mossadegh. One Iranian conservative newspaper even editorialized:

"...the Tudeh Party, with its satanic doctrine of class struggles, has incited ignorant workers to violate the sacred right of private property and inflict social anarchy upon the center of the country. This uprising proves that Tudeh is an enemy of private property, of Iran, and of Islam. If the government does not stamp out Tudeh, the local revolt will inevitably spread into a general revolution."

=== Mosaddegh era, his overthrow and aftermath ===
The party played an important role both directly and indirectly during the pivotal era of Iranian history that began with the 1951 nationalization of the British Anglo-Iranian Oil Company (AIOC), and ended with the 1953 overthrow of Mohammad Mosaddegh by a CIA-led coup d'état. The party's policy "fluctuated", first attacking Mossaddegh as 'an agent of American imperialism', then giving him some support during and after the July 1952 uprising. On 15 August a coup attempt against Mossaddegh was thwarted thanks in part to information uncovered by the Tudeh TPMO military network, but two days later party militants inadvertently helped destabilized the government by staging demonstrations to pressure Mossaddegh to declare Iran a democratic republic. As this would have overturned Iran's constitutional monarchy, Mossaddegh reacted by calling out troops to suppress the demonstrators. The party then demobilized late the next day making it unavailable to fight the coup the day after. By 1957 the TPMO was crushed and thousands of party members had been arrested.

==== Oil nationalization ====
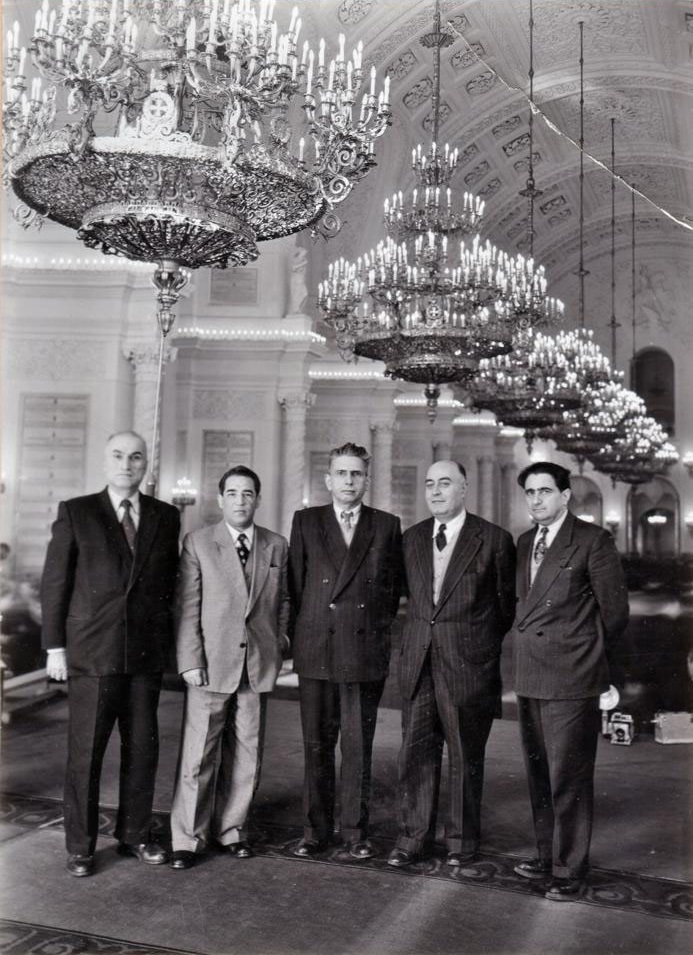
Senior members of Tudeh in 1955 (left to right): Rousta, Keshavarz, Radmanesh, Eskandari and Kambakhsh

Following World War II, Iranian public support was growing for the nationalization of the British Anglo-Iranian Oil Company (AIOC) whose profits had greatly exceeded its royalty payments to the Iranian government.

In 1951, Mohammad Mosaddegh, head of the nationalist movement known as the National Front of Iran, led parliament in the nationalization of AIOC, and shortly after was appointed prime minister by the Shah. Mosaddegh oversaw the takeover of British oil facilities and rising economic difficulty and polarization in Iran as the AIOC withdrew its employees and retaliated with a boycott of Iranian oil.

In early April 1951, the Tudeh revealed its "true strength" by launching strikes and riots protesting low wages and poor housing and delays in the nationalization of the oil industry. There were "street demonstrations and sympathy strikes in Tehran, Isfahan, and the northern cities." Police opened fire on demonstrators. A result was "panic" in Iran's parliament at the power of Marxist forces in Iran. With this, it became apparent that Mossaddegh was not a communist and that the Tudeh did not control the government, nor did the party want to overthrow him even as it was establishing a broad public base.

During this period the Tudeh followed a "leftist" rather than "popular front" strategy, refusing to ally with Mosaddegh. Despite the fact that Mosaddegh had introduced a new policy of tolerance toward the party, that both the Tudeh and Mosaddegh had worked for nationalization of the AIOC, and that expropriation of capitalist Western-owned resource extracting corporations by poor countries was central to Marxist–Leninist doctrine, the party vigorously and relentlessly opposed Mosaddegh and his program. In a June 1950 article in its daily Mardom it described the effects of Mosaddegh's policy thusly:

Already we can be sure that revisions in the southern oil contract will not be in favor of our people and will only result in the consolidation of England's position in our country. ... The solution to the oil question is related to the victory of our party, that is, the people of Iran.

On 16 July 1952, Mosaddegh resigned after the shah refused to accept his nomination for War Minister. Mosaddegh appealed to the general public for support, but Tudeh press continued to attack him, describing his differences with the shah "as merely one between different factions of a reactionary ruling elite." It was only after the explosion of popular support for Mosaddegh in the street that "many rank-and-file" Tudeh party members "could see first hand Mosaddegh's popularity", and came to his aid.

According to one observer:

although diverse elements participated in the July uprising, the impartial observer must confess that the Tudeh played an important part—perhaps even the most important part. ... If in the rallies before March 1952 one-third of the demonstrators had been Tudeh and two-thirds had been National Front, after March 1952, the proportions were reversed.

Ayatollah Abol-Ghasem Kashani, who later switched sides and supported the Shah, "sent a public letter to the pro-Tudeh organizations thanking them for their invaluable contribution" during the uprising toward Mosaddegh's victory.

Mosaddegh capitalized on the uprising to establish an emergency rule, which allowed him to bypass the Majles, and also to institute socialist reforms. With the Soviets not wanting to back or "shore up" Tudeh, and Harry Truman refusing demands to overthrow Mosaddegh from Clement Attlee and Winston Churchill, it would take the inauguration of Dwight Eisenhower to change the tune, greenlighting the coup operation.

==== 1953 coup ====
During this time the US government became more and more frustrated with Mosaddeq and the stalemate over negotiations with the UK government on control and compensation, with the American ambassador even questioning Mosaddeq's "mental stability". At the same time the Cold War struggle continued to dominate foreign policy thinking in the west. Soviet tanks crushed an anti-communist uprising of strikes and protests in East Germany in June 1953.

As Americans gave up hope on Mosaddeq, their propaganda and covert action campaign against the Tudeh, called TPBEDAMN, expanded to include him. In 1953, American CIA and British intelligence agents, began plotting to overthrow Mosaddeq in a coup d'état, in large part because of their fear that "rising internal tensions and continued deterioration ... might lead to a breakdown of government authority and open the way for at least a gradual assumption of control by Tudeh," just as a local communist party had led a coup in Czechoslovakia in 1948, replacing a democratic regime and constitution with a pro-Soviet, one-party Communist government.

The Tudeh also sensed a coup might be coming, and created "vanguard cells" that along with the TPMO, "identified key military installation, army depots, and command and control centers in the capital" Tehran "to react violently to any coup attempt." Released photographs by William Arthur Cram show that Tudeh organized huge demonstrations in August before the coup occurred.

The plotters' first attempt involved persuading the shah to issue an edict dismissing Mosaddegh and replacing him with retired General Fazlollah Zahedi, while arresting Mosaddegh and taking over other possible centers of opposition. On 15 August the plot was uncovered by Tudeh supporters in the military, and a contingent sent to arrest Mosaddegh was intercepted and arrested themselves. Colonel Mohammad Ali Mobasherri, was a member of the TPMO's (secret) three-man secretariat, but also an active member of Tehran Military Governor, the center of the coup operation. Major Hehdi Homaouni served in the shah's Imperial Guard and discovered and reported the August plot to the party. In a recent set of documents released by the National Security Archive, which noted pro-Shah demonstrators sacked pro-Tudeh and pro-Mossadegh establishments, it was noted that British and American intelligence agents infiltrated Tudeh so it could blunt Mossadegh. These documents also noted that Eisenhower and Truman differed in their assessments of Mossadegh, with Eisenhower feeling he could not as effectively counter Tudeh as Truman and the CIA in August 1953 downplaying "the likelihood of a Tudeh overthrow attempt" but fears the Tudeh taking power in a more long-term fashion.

The coup attempt created a backlash against its perpetrators, including the shah. The already anti-monarchical Tudeh supporters were radicalized and on the morning of 17 August "an angry crowd began to attack symbols of the monarchy" and demanded its abolition. Mosaddegh, who was aware of Western fears of the Tudeh and who had worked to limit the power of the shah but had "never suggested he was in favor of abolishing the constitutional monarchy," saw these attacks as a challenge, as removing the shah would violate the constitution. The next day his regime ordered the military into the streets, and "up to 600 mid and low-level Tudeh activists were arrested in Tehran alone." With its network "severely damaging" the party reversed course once again, and "ordered a demobilization" of its preparations to fight a coup.

Taking advantage of the quiet, the CIA and its Iranian allies struck again, and on 19 August the coup d'état replaced Mosaddegh with Zahedi. The coup was a major event in Third World and 20th Century history and there is debate as to how much of the blame for the overthrow can be traced to bribes paid by the CIA and how much to domestic dissatisfaction with Mossadegh. Whatever the motivations, Mohammad Reza Pahlavi thereafter assumed dictatorial powers and banned most political groups, including Mosaddegh's National Front, which along with the Tudeh Party, continued to function underground.

==== Crackdown following coup ====
The mass arrests, destruction of its organization and execution of some 40–50 leaders following the coup has been said to have "destroyed" the Tudeh. Between 1953 and 1957, Iranian security forces using "brute force, together with the breaking of the cryptographic code – probably with CIA know-how – … tracked down 4,121 party members." This constituted the whole Tudeh underground and "more than half the party membership". Tudeh infiltration of the military by the TPMO totaled 477 members in the armed forces, "22 colonels, 69 majors, 100 captains, 193 lieutenants, 19 noncommissioned officers, and 63 military cadets." Ervand Abrahamian notes that none of these was in the "crucial tank divisions around Tehran" that could have been used for a coup d'état and which the Shah had screened carefully. "Ironically, a Tudeh colonel had been in charge of the Shah's personal security – as well as that of Vice President Richard Nixon when he visited Iran. The Tudeh had the opportunity to assassinate the Shah and the U.S. vice president but not to launch a coup." Maziar Behrooz is more optimistic about the party's chances of stopping the coup, saying that while "most of the Tudeh officers were in non-combat posts," they "were in a position to access and distribute weapons. In their memoirs, TPMO high- and middle-ranking members have confirmed their ability to distribute weapons and even assassinate key Iranian leaders of the coup. Hence, with a disciplined party membership, backed by military officers with access to weapons, the Tudeh had a strong hand."

With the TPMO decimated, the Tudeh network was compromised as the TPMO had "acted as a shield for the party" and helped preserve it immediately after Mosaddeq's overthrow. "Many high- and middle-ranking Tudeh leaders were arrested or forced to flee the country. The arrest and execution of Khosro Roozbeh in 1957-8 signaled the end of this process."

==== Tudeh verdict ====
After the fact, the party engaged in self-criticism of its policies toward Mosaddeq at its Fourth Plenum held in Moscow in July 1957. They found them "sectarian and leftist" and did not to recognizing "the progressive nature" of the oil nationalization movement.

=== Late 1950s and 1960s ===
The Sino–Soviet split caused some splintering of the party in the early 1960s, with at least one Maoist group breaking away. In the mid-1960s, the U.S. State Department estimated the party membership to be approximately 1500.

In 1965, the party faced a second division between the mainstream of the organization and the splinter faction, which advocated a violent struggle against the government by arming the tribes of southern Iran. This faction caused a great deal of damage and three years passed before the unity of the party was restored. The remnants of this faction are known as the Labour Party of Iran.

In 1966, several party members, including Ali Khavari and Parviz Hekmatjoo of the Central Committee, and Asef Razmdideh and Saber Mohammadzadeh, were arrested and sentenced to death. This sparked an international outcry and hunger strikes in Europe which forced the government to reduce the sentences to life imprisonment. These events created much international sympathy for the worker's struggle in Iran and helped unify the party after the split. The Tudeh Party from this point on becomes established as one of the strongest underground movements and helps to pave the way for the forthcoming Iranian Revolution of 1979.

Members of the Tudeh Party additionally maintained contact with Afghan Commando Forces personnel during the late 1960s and early 1970s, who were in the People's Democratic Party of Afghanistan, helping them distribute leftist and "progressive" magazines among the commando battalions.

=== Iranian Revolution of 1979 ===
In the early 1970s, the Iranian guerrilla movement began in northern Iran in the province of Mazandaran. The 1970s also witnessed the birth of widespread worker strikes and demonstrations, and university campuses became a hotbed of revolutionary activity.

The Tudeh Party dramatically increased its activities in the 1970s. In 1973, Tudeh released a brochure titled "Oil from Iran and imperialist oil monopolies," likely advocating for oil nationalization. In November 1978, they recruited youths and held demonstrations at the University of Tehran for the first time in 15 years, in support of Shia clergymen against the Shah. Tudeh also organized regional committees, and by 1980, they supported the Islamic Revolution when others on the left opposed it.

=== Islamic Republic ===
During the revolution, many political prisoners were freed and the Tudeh Party and other leftist groups were able to participate in the presidential and parliamentary elections for the first time in many years. However, the majority of seats in the Majlis were won by the Islamic Republican Party of Ayatollah Beheshti and leftist and nationalist organizations were forced out of the loop. The newly elected president, Abolhassan Banisadr, who had originally been close with Ayatollah Khomeini, also became increasingly frustrated with the developments that had been taking place and opposed the domination of the clergy and the religious factions in Iranian politics. In addition, the party denounced Amnesty International's call to end the summary executions and called it "blatant interference in Iranian affairs".

In 1981, the Majlis, dominated by the Islamic Republican Party, forced Banisadr out of office, which initiated a wave of protests and demonstrations from all segments of the populace. Banisadr later fled the country. Armed revolutionary committees loyal to Khomeini (which came to be known as the Pasdaran) arrested many thousands of youth and activists from both nationalist and leftist groups, many of whom were later tried by Lajevardi, known as the Hanging Judge, and executed.

At this point in the history of the Tudeh Party, the Christian and Azeris within the population were prominent.

==== Suppression ====
While other leftist parties opposed the Islamist forces at this time and were suppressed as a result, Tudeh Party leadership as well as the Fadaian Aksariat decided to support the new clerical theocratic regime. This may have been to try to follow the pro-Tehran line of the Soviet Union.

In 1982, however, the Tudeh broke ranks. The Islamist government of Iran had closed down the Tudeh newspaper and purged Tudeh members from government ministries. According to the Mitrokhin Archive, Vladimir Kuzichkin, a KGB officer stationed in Tehran, had defected to the British in 1982. MI6 used this information and shared the information with the CIA. Their information was then shared with the Iranian government by the CIA, which was secretly courting Iran, as part of the Iran–Contra affair.

Quite quickly the government arrested and imprisoned its leadership and later more than 10,000 members of the party. In February 1983, the leaders of the Tudeh Party were arrested and the Party disbanded, leaving Iran effectively a one-party state. The Tudeh arrests revealed that once again the party had managed to find supporters among the armed forces, as a number of officers, prominent among them Admiral Bahram Afzali, commander of the Iranian navy, were arrested. These arrests ended the alliance between the Tudeh Party and the ruling clergy of Iran and it collapsed, even as the Soviets worked with the Iranians to build up their nuclear capabilities. Even with this agreement, the Iranian government saw the Soviets as "atheistic devils" and the Soviets did not like the government because it had suppressed the Tudeh.

International media, such as UPI, reported that along with the banning of the Tudeh party, 18 Soviet diplomats were expelled from the country for "blatant interference." At the same time, Tudeh was accused of working on behalf of "foreign powers," with the suppression praised by Khomeini.

From 1 May 1983 to 1 May 1984 almost all of the Tudeh leadership appeared in videos, first individually and then jointly in an October 1983 "roundtable discussion," confessing to "treason", "subversion", "horrendous crimes", praising Islam and proclaiming Islamic government's superiority over atheistic Marxism–Leninism. British officials supported Iran's crackdown and joked about the state torture techniques used to extract the confessions. British officials were pleased by the repression not primarily because they were concerned about Soviet influence in the country since they knew that Iran was quite independent of that, but because they wanted to curry favor with the Iranian regime.

On 1 May 1984 Ehsan Tabari, appeared on television. A man with "50 years of leftist experiences" told viewers he had read "great Islamic thinkers" such as Ayatollah Motahhari in prison following the 1982 crackdown and had now come

to repudiate the works he had written over the past 40 years. He now realized that his entire life's work was 'defective', 'damaging', and 'totally spurious' because it had all been based on unreliable thinkers – Freemasons nourished by the Pahlavis; secularists such as Ahmad Kasravi; Western liberals and Marxists linked to 'imperialism' and 'Zionism' …

In his recantation, Tabari made frequent references to religion, the Twelve Imams and Islamic thinkers and "praised Islam for its `great spiritual strength.`"

The suspicions of outside observers that the confession was not given freely were reinforced by the absence of Taqi Keymanash and "13 other members" of the Tudeh central committee, who died during prison interrogation. The rapid disintegration of the Tudeh at the hands of the state, and the confessions of its leaders led the opposition and remaining party members to seek answers. Explanations ranged from ideological capitulation to the use of inhuman methods of trial. The remnant of the party outside the country resorted to strange explanations that special drugs created by the CIA and MI-6 were used. The simplest explanation came several years after the television recantations, from a prison visit by a United Nations' human rights representative (Galindo Pohl) to Iran. The Tudeh Party General Secretary Noureddin Kianouri was reported to have told the representative that he and his wife had been tortured to give false confessions. As evidence, he held up his badly set broken arm. Pohl added that Maryam Firuz had difficulty hearing, swallowing food, and sitting down because of beatings suffered eight years earlier at the hands of the Shah's secret police. Kianouri later wrote an open letter to the Ayatollah detailing his mistreatment.

As a result of these purges, a great number of party members left the country into exile. As the party represented the "Soviet view of a preferred leftist movement" that holds a pro-Soviet ideological line and responds to Soviet foreign policy in a supportive manner, the Soviet Union was likely disappointed at the development. It is likely many hundreds Tudeh prisoners were killed during the 1988 executions of Iranian political prisoners when thousands of Mojahedin and leftist prisoners were killed. One report lists 90 Tudeh killed in just some blocks of Evin and Gohar Dasht prisons.

== Electoral history ==
Year	Election	Seats won
1943	Parliament	8 / 136(6%)
1947	Parliament	2 / 136(1%)
Banned in 1949 election
1952	Parliament	0 / 79(0%)
Did not contest between 1953 and 1978 due to being banned
1979	Constitutional Assembly	0 / 73(0%)
1980	Parliament	0 / 270(0%)
Banned since 1983

== Estimated membership ==
Year	Members	Ref
1942	2,087 (towards September)	
1942	6,000	
1944	25,800	
1945	69,000	
1946	50,000 core members + 100,000 affiliates	
1946	80,000	
1947	50,000–200,000	
1947	275,000 including affiliated labor unions' membership	
1949	25,000	
1952	20,000	
1952	50,000 including sympathizers and affiliated membership	
1953	15,000–20,000	
1953	25,000 + 300,000 sympathizers	
1965	3,000	
1967	≤ 1,000	
1977	5,000	
1979	1,500 + 400 exiled in East Germany	
1979	7,000 armed in Tehran	
1980	5,000	
1983	≤ 5,000	

== Current status ==
Despite the repression, the party has managed to survive. Though since the Iranian Revolution the party is officially banned in Iran and individuals found to be affiliated with communist or socialist groups risk imprisonment, active members have remained and it continues to operate as an underground political organization there. This was mentioned in an Amnesty International report on political prisoners in Iran.

Today, the party leadership is mainly based in exile, as is the new Central Committee, elected in 1992. The party has taken positions against privatization, criticizes the electoral system in the country, and "anti-labor" legislation. In 2017, the party supported Jean-Luc Mélenchon as a leftist force in France, commemorated the Russian Revolution, pledged solidarity with the Venezuelan Communist Party, and criticized Iranian reformists for betraying their ideals. Additionally, the party condemned the missile attacks on Syria in April 2017 by Donald Trump, the only element of the Iranian opposition to do so, and has many wide-ranging party anthems on their website. In 2020, the party condemned the Trump Administration's airstrike which killed Qasem Soleimani, while simultaneously criticizing the Iranian government for intervening in both Iraq and Lebanon.

During the 2025–2026 Iranian protests the party called for continued struggle against the Islamic Republic government which, like other dissident political movements, they described as engaging in "despotism" and authoritarianism. The party cautioned against U.S. interventionism and attempts to restore monarchy in Iran, citing requests by Reza Pahlavi for foreign intervention.

== Leadership ==
#	Image	Name	Tenure		Title	Ref
#	Image	Name	From	To	Title	Ref
1		Soleiman Eskandari	1941	1944	Chairman	
2		Iraj Eskandari	1944	1948	General-Secretaries (Shared)	
2		Mohammad Bahrami	1944	1948	General-Secretaries (Shared)	
2		Noureddin Alamouti	1944	1948	General-Secretaries (Shared)	
3		Reza Radmanesh	1948	1969	First-Secretary	
4		Mohammad Bahrami	1949	1953	Acting First-Secretary	
5		Iraj Eskandari	1969	1979	First-Secretary	
6		Noureddin Kianouri	1979	1984	First-Secretary	
7		Ali Khavari	1983	1984	Acting First-Secretary	
7		Ali Khavari	1984	2021	First-Secretary	
8		Unknown	2021	present	First-Secretary	

== Members of the politburo ==
- Akbar Schandermani

== See also ==
- Political parties in Iran
- Constitutionalist movement of Gilan
- Soviet Republic of Gilan
- "Iran is not just Tehran"
