= List of Humboldt University of Berlin people =

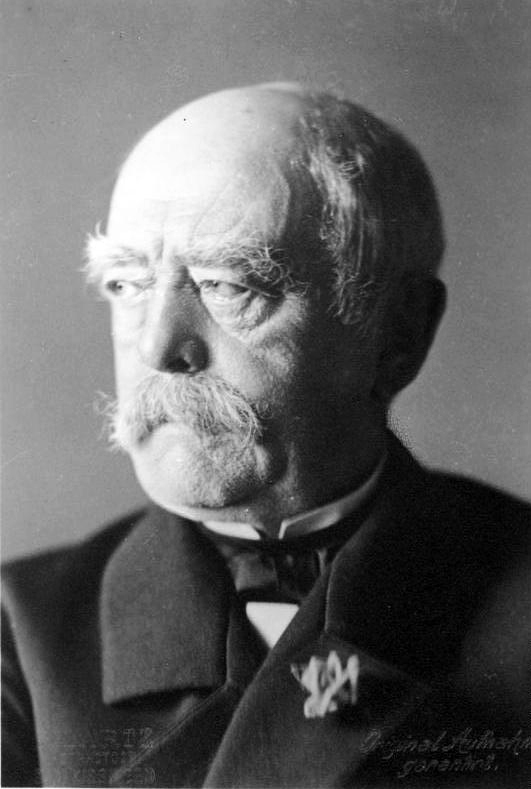
Otto von Bismarck

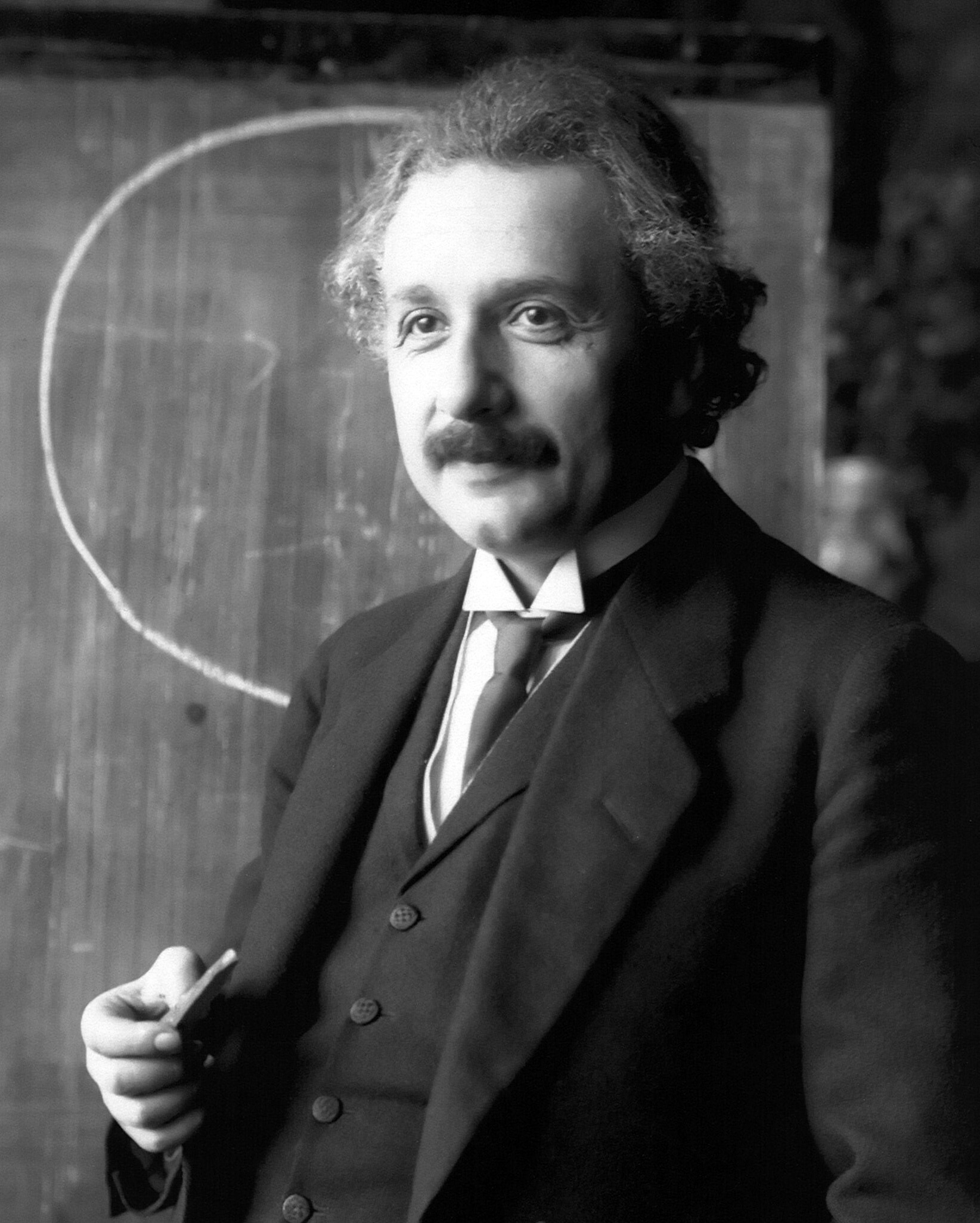
Albert Einstein

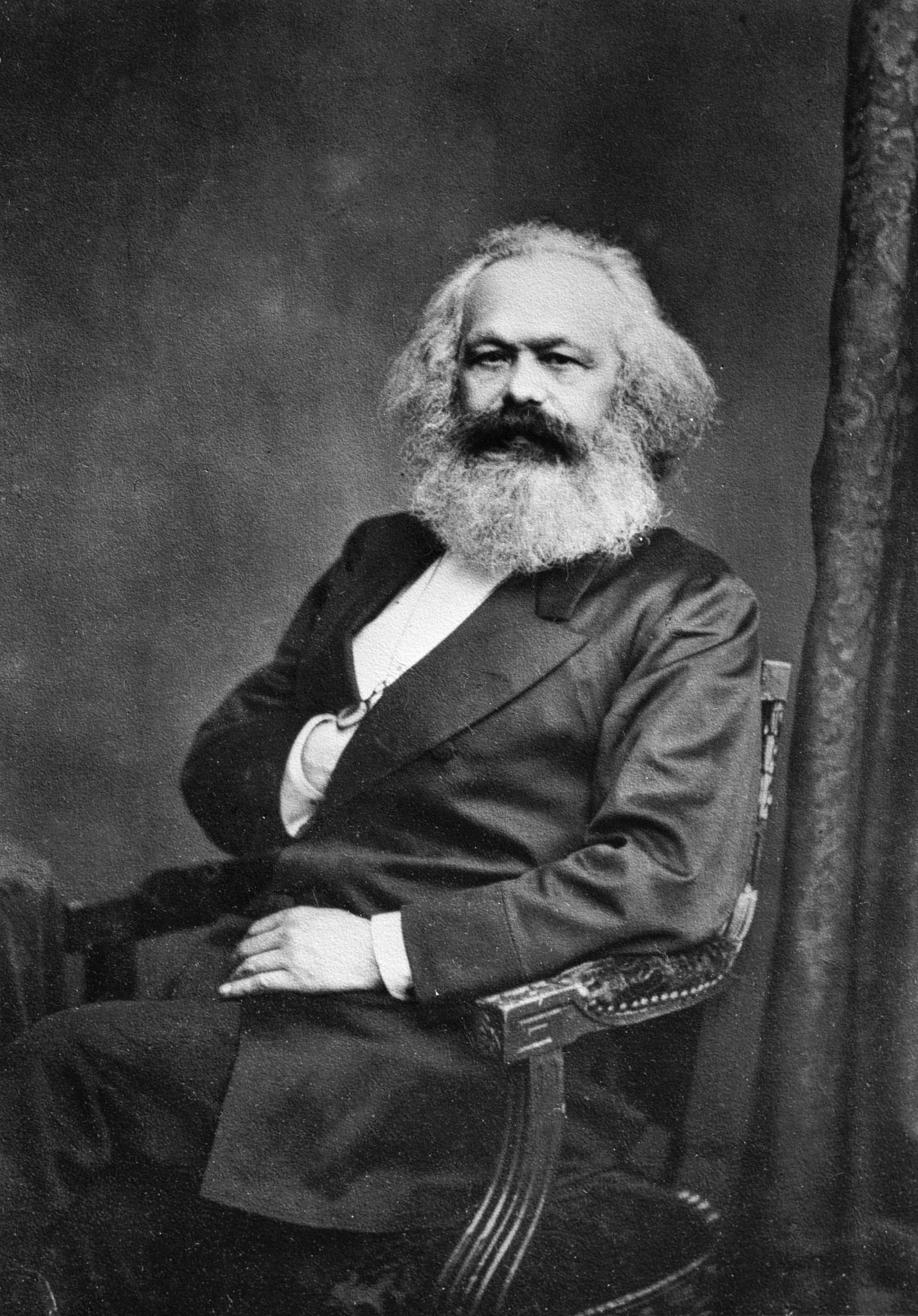
Karl Marx

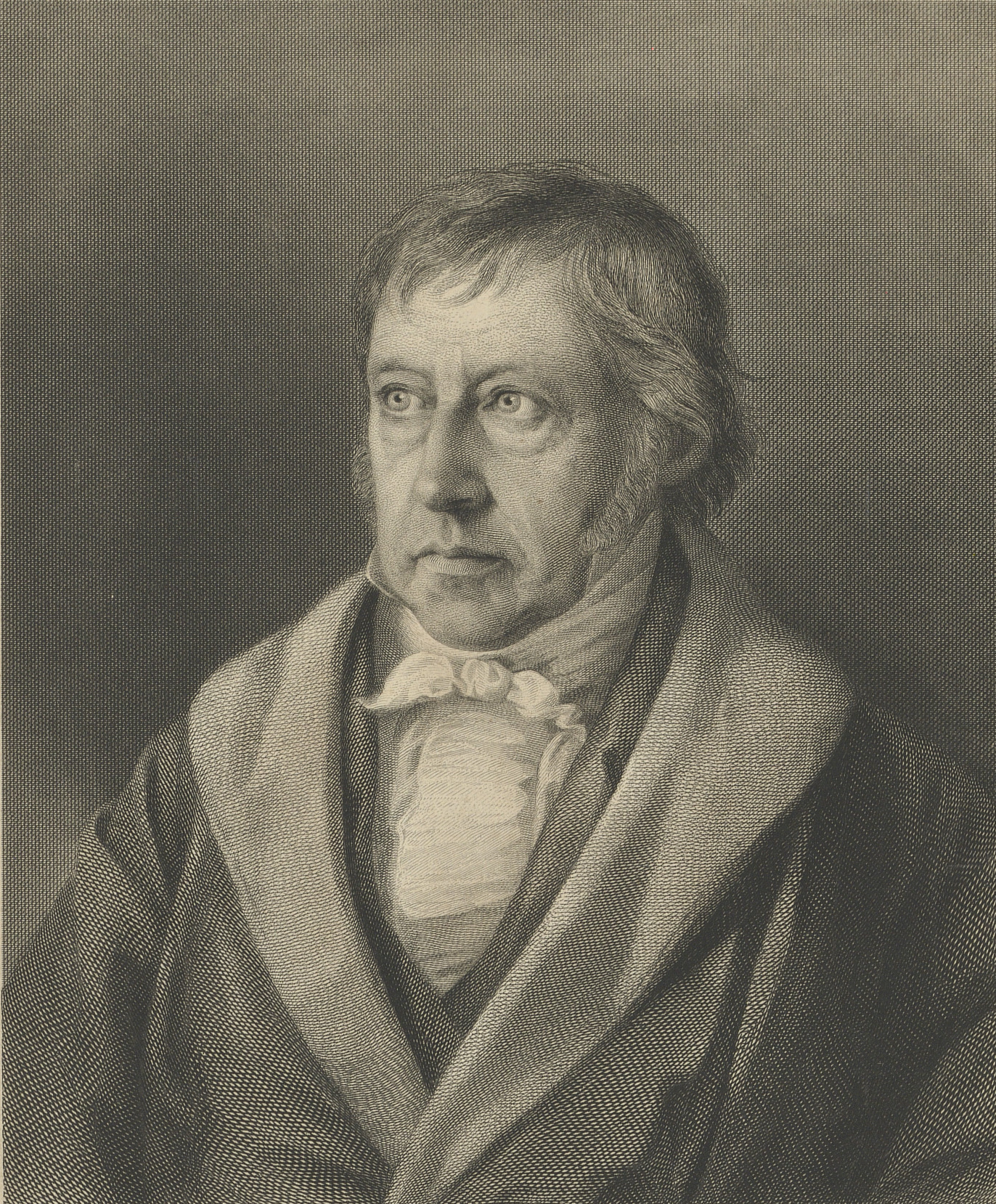
Georg Hegel

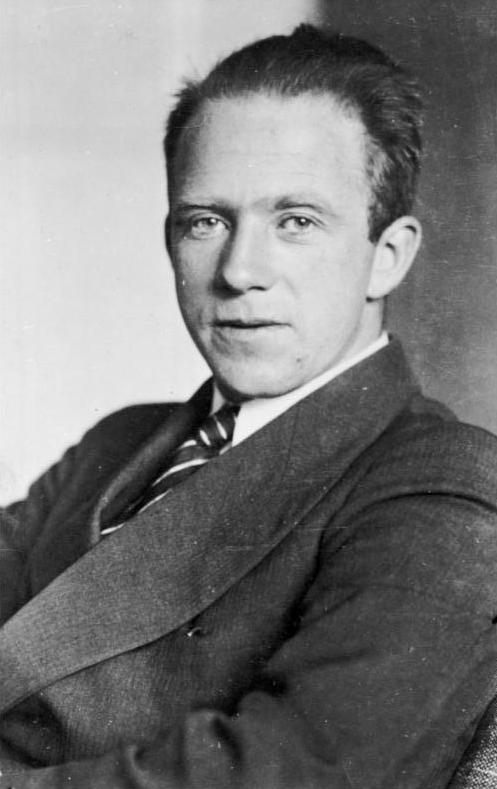
Werner Heisenberg

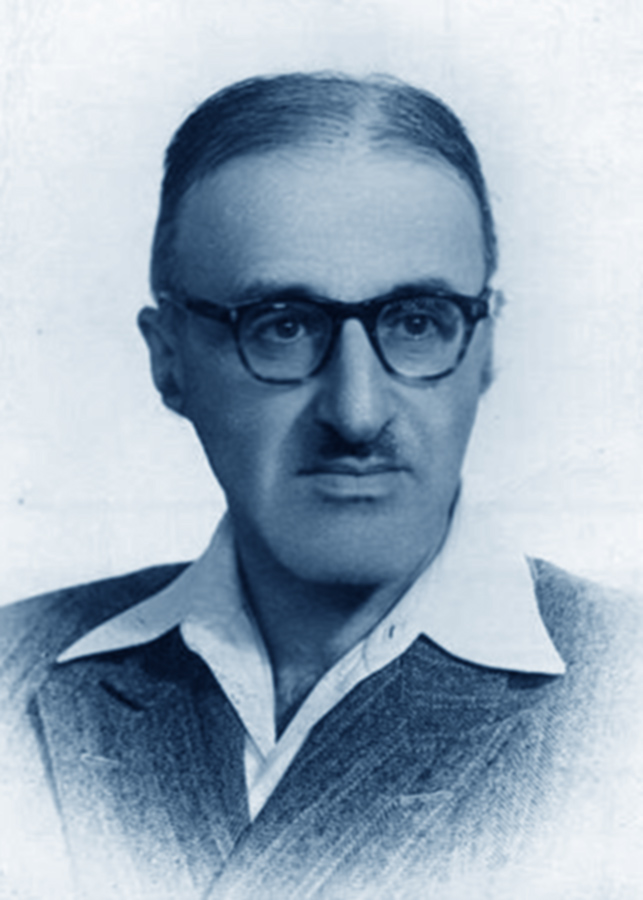
Yeshayahu Leibowitz

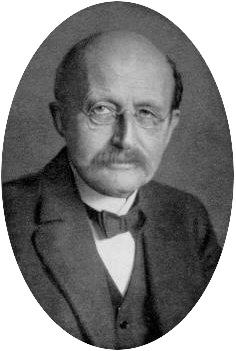
Max Planck

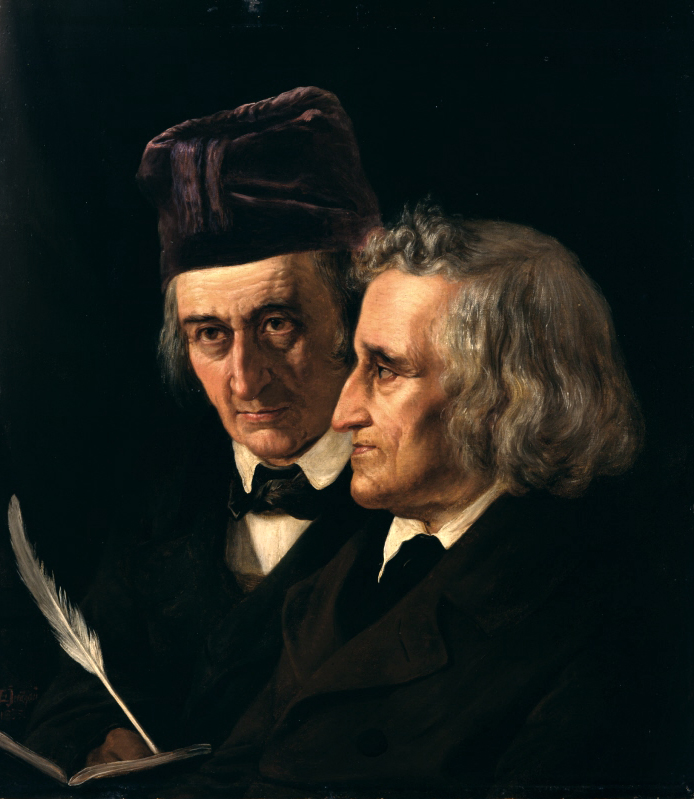
Jakob and Wilhelm Grimm

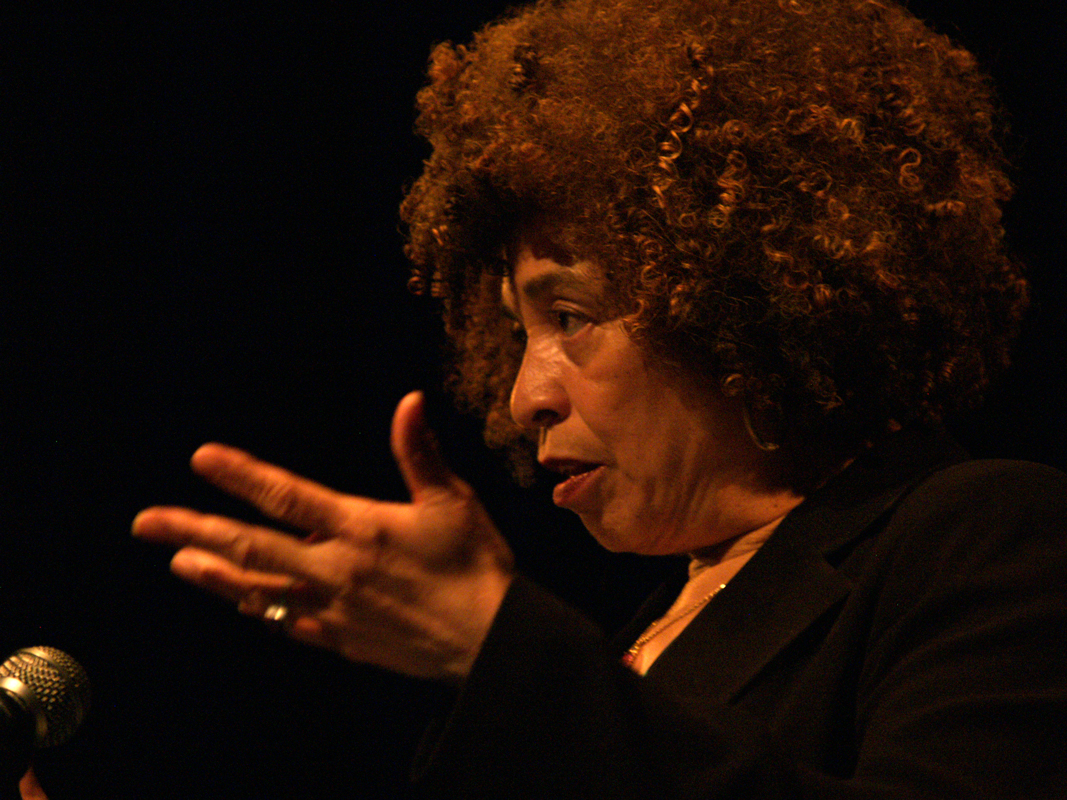
Angela Davis

The following is a list of individuals associated with Humboldt University of Berlin through attending as a student, or serving as a member of the faculty or staff. As of October 2020, the university has been associated with 57 Nobel Prize winners (including former students, faculty and researchers).

- Bozorg Alavi (1904–1997), novelist and writer
- Alexander Altmann (1906–1987), rabbi and scholar of Jewish philosophy and mysticism
- Gerhard Anschütz (1867–1948), leading jurisprudent and "father of the constitution" of the state of Hesse
- Arthur Arndt (1893–1974), physician who hid with his family during the Holocaust, the largest known surviving group of people to hide in Germany
- Jörg Baberowski (born 1961), professor of eastern European history
- Michelle Bachelet (born 1951), pediatrician and epidemiologist, president of the Republic of Chile
- Shepard Barclay (1847–1925), justice of the Supreme Court of Missouri
- Bruno Bauer (1809–1882), theologian, Bible critic and philosopher
- Jurek Becker (1937–1997), writer (Jacob the Liar)
- Max Bergmann (1886–1944), biochemist
- Azmi Bishara (born 1956), Arab-Israeli politician
- Inke Siewert (born 1980), professor of inorganic chemistry at University of Göttingen
- Eliezer Berkovits (1908–1992), rabbi, philosopher and theologian
- Willibald Beyschlag (1823–1900), theologian, publisher
- Algernon Sydney Biddle (1847–1891), American lawyer and law professor at the University of Pennsylvania Law School
- Otto von Bismarck (1815–1898), first German chancellor
- Dietrich Bonhoeffer (1906–1945), theologian and resistance fighter
- Beatrix Borchard, (born 1950), musicologist
- Louis Borchardt, (1816/17-1883), paediatrician
- Max Born (1882–1970), physicist, Nobel Prize for physics in 1954
- Siegfried Borris (1906–1987), composer, musicologist and music educator
- Aron Brand (1910–1977), pediatric cardiologist
- Rudolf Brandt (1909–1948), Nazi SS officer, executed for war crimes
- Gottlieb Burckhardt (1836–1907), psychiatrist, first physician to perform modern psychosurgery (1888)
- Stephanie Buhmann (born 1977), art critic, art historian, and curator.
- Michael C. Burda, macroeconomist
- Ezriel Carlebach (1909–1956), Israeli journalist and editorial writer
- Ernst Cassirer (1874–1945), philosopher
- Adelbert von Chamisso (1781–1838), natural scientist and writer
- Ramesh Chennamaneni (born 1956), Indian politician
- Paul Anton Cibis (1911–1965), ophthalmologist and recruit under Operation Paperclip
- Georg von Dadelsen (1918–2007), musicologist, Neue Bach-Ausgabe
- Angela Davis (born 1944), political activist, educator, author, philosopher
- Gustav Adolf Deissmann (1866–1937), theologian, New Testament Greek philologist, author, Nobel nominee
- Suat Derviş (1904/1905–1972), Turkish novelist, journalist, and political activist
- Harilal Dhruv (1856–1896), Indian lawyer, poet, indologist
- Hermann Alexander Diels, (1848–1922), classical scholar
- Wilhelm Dilthey (1833–1911), philosopher
- Georg Dohrn, conductor
- W. E. B. Du Bois (1868–1963), African-American activist and scholar
- William Duane (1872–1935), physicist
- E. A. Dupont (1891–1956), film director, pioneer of the German film industry
- Benedykt Dybowski (1833–1930), zoologist, pioneer of Limnology
- Paul Ehrlich (1854–1915), physician, Nobel Prize for medicine in 1908
- Albert Einstein (1879–1955), physicist, Nobel Prize for physics in 1921
- Gotthold Eisenstein (1823–1852), mathematician, specialized in number theory and analysis
- Friedrich Engels (1820–1895), journalist and philosopher
- Annemarie Esche, scholar of Burmese literature
- Ludwig Andreas Feuerbach (1804–1872), philosopher
- Johann Gottlieb Fichte (1762–1814), philosopher, rector of the university (1810–1812)
- Horst Fischer (1912–1966), SS concentration camp doctor executed for war crimes
- Emil Fischer (1852–1919), founder of modern biochemistry, Nobel Prize in chemistry in 1902
- Bruno Flierl (b. 1927), architect and city planner
- Werner Forßmann (1904–1979), physician, Nobel Prize for medicine in 1956
- James Franck (1882–1964), physicist, Nobel Prize for physics in 1925
- Wilhelm Frick (1877–1946), Nazi official, executed for war crimes
- Karl Gebhardt (1897–1948), Nazi SS physician who conducted criminal medical experiments; executed for war crimes
- Ernst Gehrcke (1878–1960), experimental physicist
- Nathan Michael Gelber (1891–1966), Austrian-Israeli historian
- Jacob Grimm (1785–1863), linguist and literary critic
- Wilhelm Grimm (1786–1859), linguist and literary critic
- Ernst Guhl (1818–1862), art historian
- Gregor Gysi (1948–), German politician and lawyer
- Fritz Haber (1868–1934), chemist, Nobel Prize for chemistry in 1918
- Otto Hahn (1879–1968), chemist, Nobel Prize for chemistry in 1944
- Sir William Reginald Halliday (1886–1966), principal of King's College London (1928–1952)\
- Adolf von Harnack (1851–1930), theologian, educator, academic administrator
- Roger Härtl, neurological surgeon
- Robert Havemann (1910–1982), chemist, co-founder of European Union, and leading GDR dissident
- Georg Wilhelm Friedrich Hegel (1770–1831), philosopher, rector of the university (1830–1831)
- Heinrich Heine (1797–1856), writer and poet
- Reinhart Heinrich (1946–2006), pioneer in systems biology
- Werner Heisenberg (1901–1976), physicist, Nobel Prize for physics in 1932
- Dieter Helm (1941–2022), farmer and politician
- Hermann von Helmholtz (1821–1894), physician and physicist
- Gustav Hertz (1887–1975), physicist, Nobel Prize for physics in 1925
- Paula Hertwig (1889–1983), biologist, politician
- Heinrich Hertz (1857–1894), physicist
- Abraham Joshua Heschel (1907–1972) rabbi, philosopher, and theologian
- Jacobus Henricus van 't Hoff (1852–1911), chemist, Nobel Prize for chemistry in 1901
- Johanna Hellman (1889–1982), surgeon
- Wassily Hoeffding (1914–1991), statistician who introduced U-statistic and known for Hoeffding's inequality
- Julius Hoffory (1855–1897), phonetician, associate professor
- Max Huber (1874–1960), international lawyer and diplomat
- Christoph Wilhelm Hufeland (1762–1836), founder of macrobiotics
- Wilhelm von Humboldt (1767–1835), politician, linguist, and founder of the university
- Alexander von Humboldt (1769–1859), natural scientist
- Zakir Husain (1897–1969), third president of India
- Yitzchok Hutner, American Orthodox rabbi and rosh yeshiva (dean)
- Sadi Irmak (1904–1990), Prime minister of Turkey
- Elisabeth Jastrow (1890–1981), German-born American classical archaeologist
- Hermann Kasack (1896–1966), writer
- George F. Kennan (1904–2005), American diplomat, political scientist and historian
- Gustav Kirchhoff (1824–1887), physicist
- Philip Klein (1849–1926), rabbi
- Paul Alfred Kleinert, German writer, editor and translator
- Wilhelm Knabe (1923–2021), German ecologist, pacifist, civil servant and politician
- Robert Koch (1843–1910), physician, Nobel Prize for medicine in 1905
- Komitas Vardapet (1869–1935) Armenian priest, composer, ethnomusicologist, music pedagogue, singer, choirmaster and the founder of the Armenian classical music.
- Albrecht Kossel (1853–1927), physician, Nobel Prize for medicine in 1910
- Arnold Kutzinski (died 1956), psychiatrist
- Joseph-Louis Lagrange (1736 – 1813), mathematician, physicist, worked at the Prussian Academy of Sciences, the predecessor of the University of Berlin
- Edmund Landau (1877–1938), mathematician
- Diana Lange, Tibetologist and Sinologist, professor of history and cultures of Central Asia
- Arnold von Lasaulx (1839–1886), mineralogist and petrographer
- Max von Laue (1879–1960), physicist, Nobel Prize for physics in 1914
- Yeshayahu Leibowitz (1903–1994), Israeli public intellectual and polymath
- Nechama Leibowitz Israeli Bible scholar
- Walter Lenkeit (1900–1986), veterinarian, professor at the University of Göttingen
- Wassily Leontief (1905–1999), economist, Nobel Prize for economics in 1973
- James Lewin (1887–1937), physician and psychiatrist
- Karl Liebknecht (1871–1919), socialist politician and revolutionary
- Frederick Lindemann, 1st Viscount Cherwell (1886–1957), British-German Physicist, Advisor to Winston Churchill during WW II. Inventor of the U-Boat detecting surface radar and proponent of carpet bombing of German cities.
- Friedrich Loeffler (1852–1915), bacteriologist
- Ram Manohar Lohia (1910–1967), Indian activist and politician
- Karl Adolf Lorenz (1837–1923), composer
- Ivan Lysiak Rudnytsky (1919–1984), Ukrainian-Canadian historian, political scientist, publicist
- Andreas Maercker, (born 1960), clinical psychologist
- Judah Leon Magnes, rabbi, Chancellor/President of the Hebrew University of Jerusalem, 1925–1948
- Herbert Marcuse (1898–1979), philosopher
- Karl Marx (1818–1883), philosopher and sociologist
- Lippman Mayer (1841–1904), rabbi
- Ernst Mayr (1904–2005), biologist
- Benjamin Mazar (1906–1995), President of Hebrew University of Jerusalem
- Joachim Mrugowsky (1905–1948), Nazi doctor executed for war crimes
- Lise Meitner (1878–1968), physicist, Enrico Fermi Award in 1966
- Felix Mendelssohn (1809–1847), composer
- Eilhard Mitscherlich (1794–1863), German chemist
- Theodor Mommsen (1817–1903), historian, Nobel Prize for literature in 1902
- Edmund Montgomery (1835–1911), philosopher, scientist, physician
- Walther Nernst (1864 – 1941), physical chemist
- John von Neumann (1903–1957), mathematician and physicist
- Adalbert Parmet (1830–1898), priest and professor
- Max Planck (1858–1947), physicist, Nobel Prize for physics in 1918
- William Popper (1874–1963), Orientalist and professor
- Gordon Prange (1910–1980), American historian
- Leopold von Ranke (1795–1886), historian
- Otto Friedrich Ranke (1899–1959), physiologist
- Ingeborg Rapoport (1912–2017), paediatrician
- Samuel Mitja Rapoport (1912–2004), biochemist, leading scientist in the German Democratic Republic
- Tom Rapoport (born 1947), biochemist
- Adolph Moses Radin (1848–1909), rabbi
- Erich Regener (1881–1955), physicist
- Robert Remak (1815–1865), cell biologist
- Ludwig Scheeffer (1859–1885), mathematician
- Friedrich Wilhelm Joseph Schelling (1775–1854), philosopher
- Friedrich Daniel Ernst Schleiermacher (1768–1834), philosopher
- Moritz Schlick (1882–1936), philosopher
- Bernhard Schlink (born 1944), writer, Der Vorleser (The Reader)
- Max Schloessinger (1877–1944), scholar
- Annette Schmiedchen (born 1966), Indologist and Padma Shri award winner
- Henry Slonimsky (1884–1970), professor
- Carl Schmitt (1888–1985), German jurist, political theorist, and professor of law
- Menachem Mendel Schneerson (1902–1994), rabbi, philosopher, theologian, engineer, educator and writer
- Edith Schönert-Geiß (1933–2012), numismatist
- Arthur Schopenhauer (1788–1860), philosopher
- Erwin Schrödinger (1887–1961), physicist, Nobel Prize for physics in 1933
- Peter Schubert (1938–2003), diplomat and albanologist
- Stepan Shahumyan (1878–1918), Armenian communist politician and head of the Baku Commune
- Georg Simmel (1858–1918), philosopher and sociologist
- Joseph B. Soloveitchik (1903–1993), rabbi, philosopher, and theologian
- Herman Smith-Johannsen (1875–1987), sportsman who introduced cross-country skiing to North America
- Werner Sombart (1863–1941), philosopher, sociologist and economist
- Hans Spemann (1869–1941), biologist, Nobel Prize for biology in 1935
- Margot Sponer (1898–1945), philologist and resistance fighter
- Hermann Stieve (1886–1952), anatomist who did research on bodies of Nazi execution victims
- Max Stirner (1806–1856), philosopher
- Yemima Tchernovitz-Avidar (1909–98), Israeli author
- Gustav Tornier (1859–1938), paleontologist and zoologist
- Kurt Tucholsky (1890–1935), writer and journalist
- Luis Villar Borda (1929–2008), Colombian politician and diplomat
- Rudolf Virchow (1821–1902), physician and politician
- Filip Neriusz Walter (1810–1847), Polish organic chemist
- Max Weber (1864–1920), sociologist, philosopher, and political economist
- Alfred Wegener (1880–1930), scientist, geologist, and meteorologist, early theorist of continental drift
- Karl Weierstraß (1815–1897), mathematician
- Max Westenhöfer (1871–1957), pathologist, proposed the Aquatic ape hypothesis, reformer of field of pathology in Chile
- Stephan Westmann (1893–1964), Professor of Obstetrics and Gynaecology
- Wilhelm Heinrich Westphal (1882–1978), physicist
- Wilhelm Wien (1864–1928), physicist, Nobel Prize for physics in 1911
- Ulrich von Wilamowitz-Moellendorff (1848–1931), philologist
- Ernest Julius Wilczynski (1876–1932), mathematician
- Richard Willstätter (1872–1942), chemist, Nobel Prize for chemistry in 1915
- Shlomo Wolbe Orthodox Rabbi and author of the Alei Shur
- Leonidas Zervas (1902–1980), Greek organic chemist

== Nobel Prize laureates ==
There are 57 Nobel Prize winners affiliated with the Humboldt University:

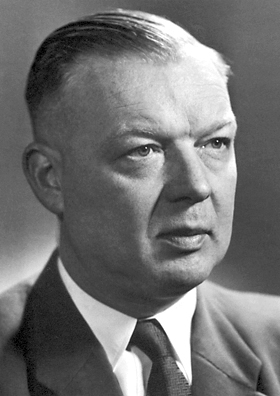
Werner Forssmann

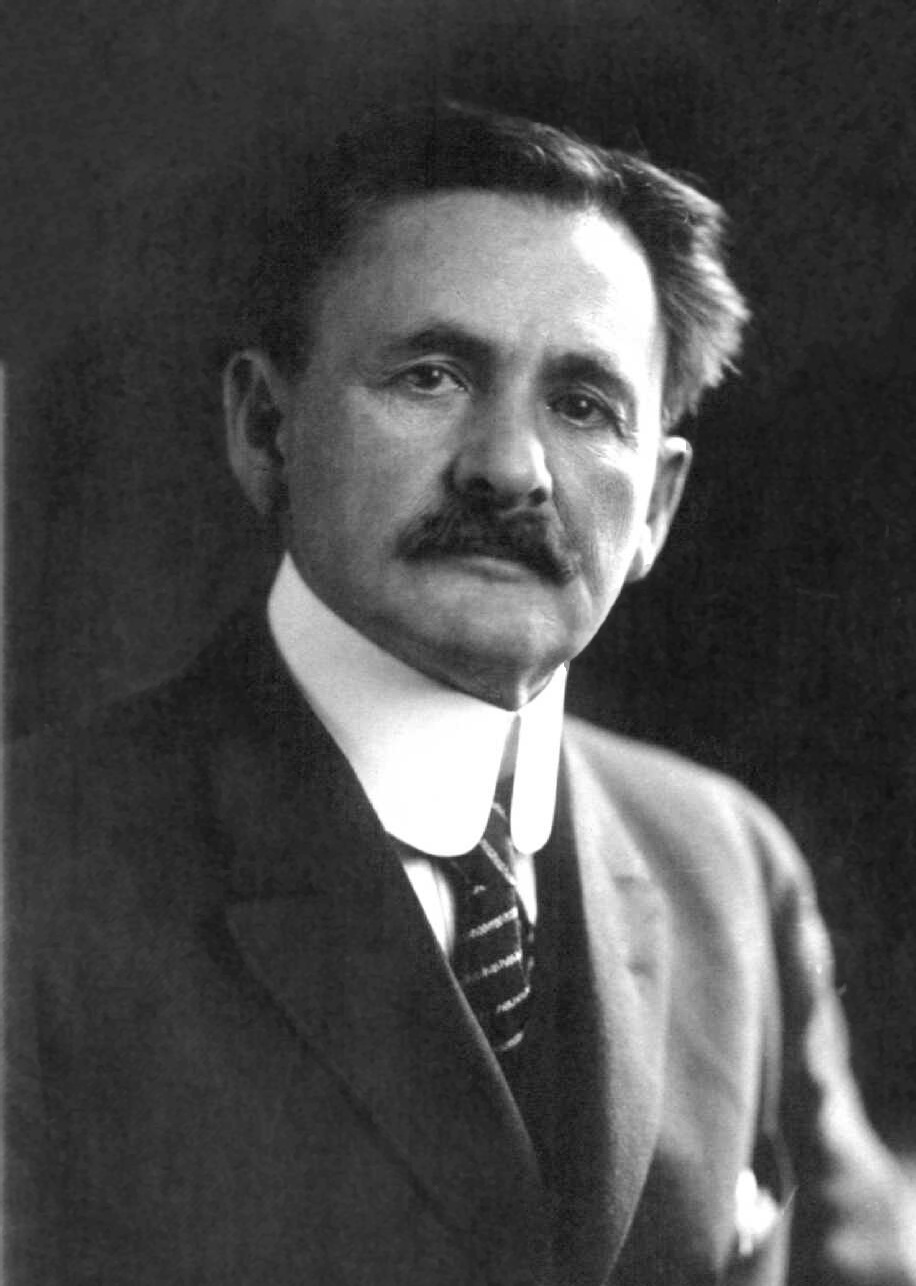
Albert Abraham Michelson

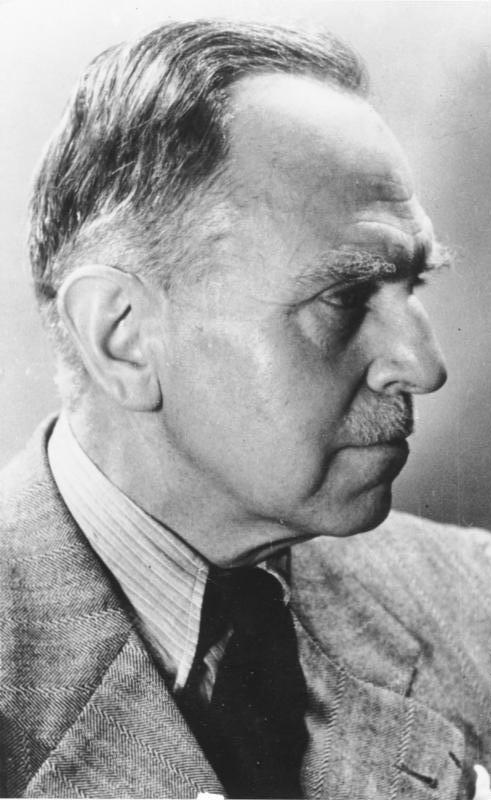
Otto Hahn

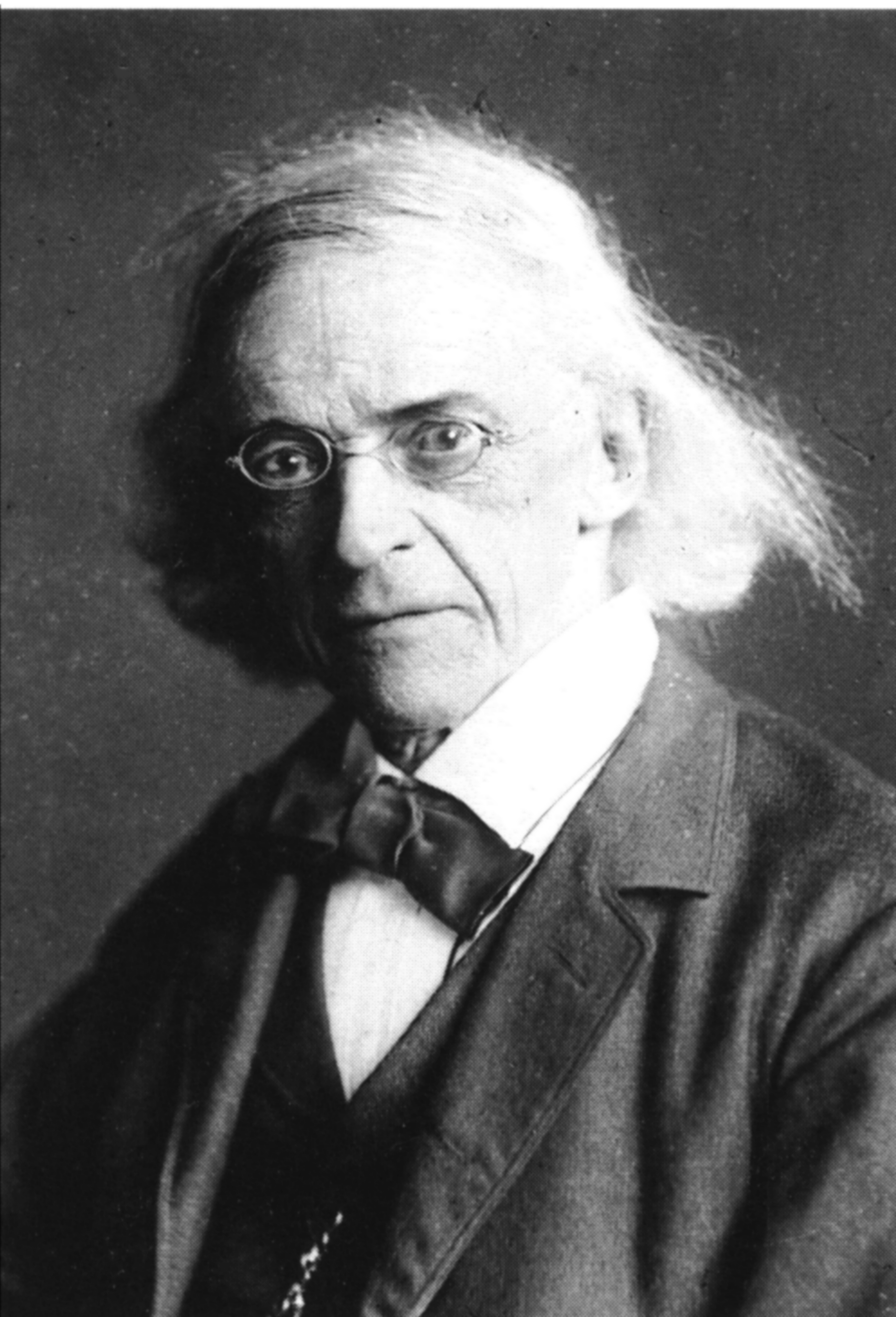
Theodor Mommsen

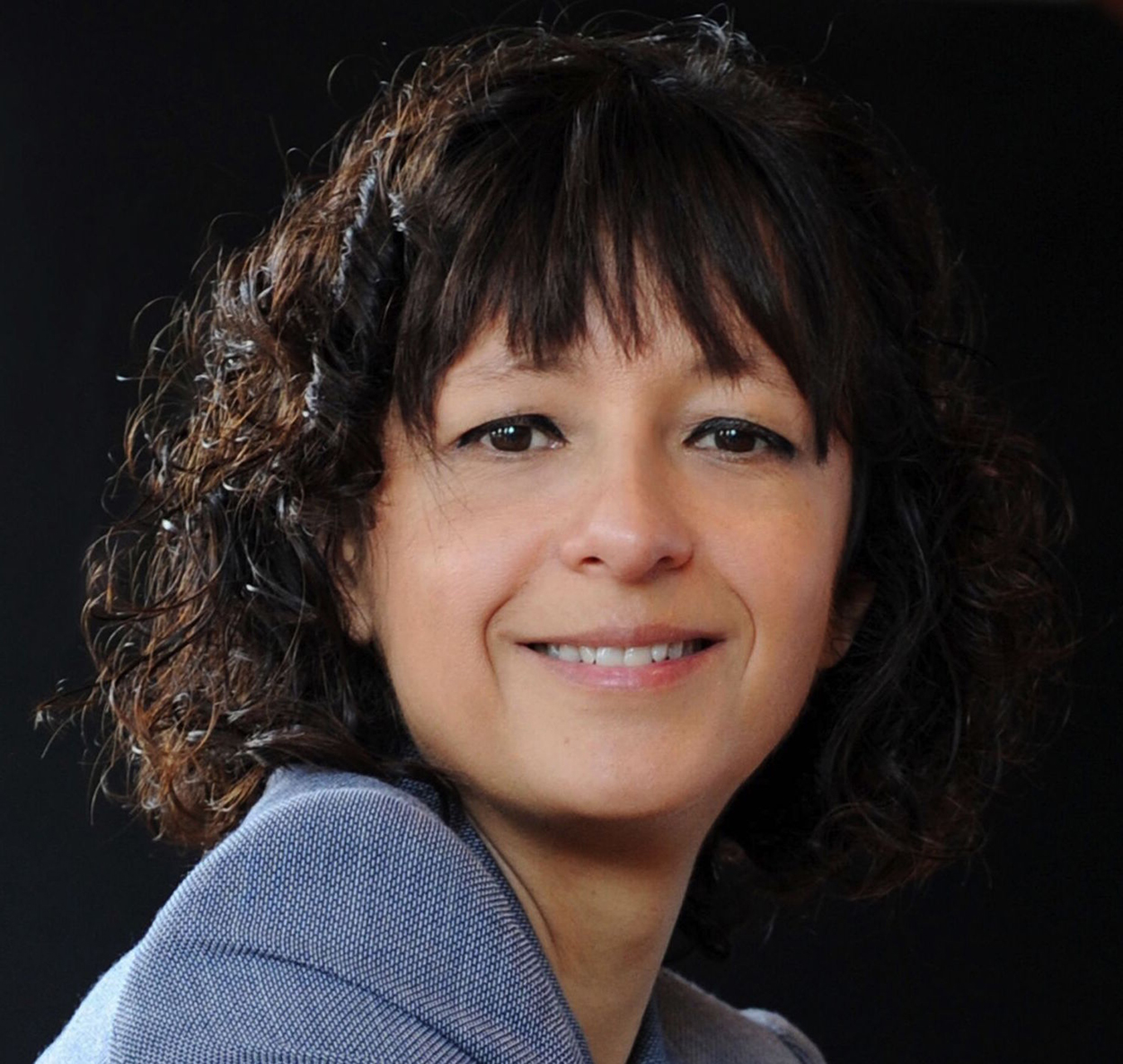
Emmanuelle Charpentier

- 1901 Jacobus Henricus van 't Hoff (Chemistry)
- 1901 Emil Adolf von Behring (Physiology or Medicine)
- 1902 Hermann Emil Fischer (Chemistry)
- 1902 Theodor Mommsen (Literature)
- 1905 Philipp Lenard (Physics)
- 1905 Adolf von Baeyer (Chemistry)
- 1905 Robert Koch (Physiology or Medicine)
- 1907 Albert Abraham Michelson (Physics)
- 1907 Eduard Buchner (Chemistry)
- 1908 Rudolf Eucken (Literature)
- 1908 Paul Ehrlich (Physiology or Medicine)
- 1909 Auguste Beernaert (Peace)
- 1909 Karl Ferdinand Braun (Physics)
- 1910 Paul Heyse (Literature)
- 1910 Otto Wallach (Chemistry)
- 1910 Albrecht Kossel (Physiology or Medicine)
- 1911 Wilhelm Wien (Physics)
- 1912 Gerhart Hauptmann (Literature)
- 1914 Max von Laue (Physics)
- 1914 Theodore William Richards (Chemistry)
- 1915 Richard Willstätter (Chemistry)
- 1918 Fritz Haber (Chemistry)
- 1918 Max Planck (Physics)
- 1920 Walther Nernst (Chemistry)
- 1921 Albert Einstein (Physics)
- 1922 Otto Meyerhof (Physiology or Medicine)
- 1923 Fritz Pregl (Chemistry)
- 1925 Gustav Ludwig Hertz (Physics)
- 1925 Austen Chamberlain (Peace)
- 1925 James Franck (Physics)
- 1925 Richard Adolf Zsigmondy (Chemistry)
- 1926 Gustav Stresemann (Peace)
- 1927 Heinrich Wieland (Chemistry)
- 1928 Adolf Otto Reinhold Windaus (Chemistry)
- 1929 Hans von Euler-Chelpin (Chemistry)
- 1930 Hans Fischer (Chemistry)
- 1931 Otto Heinrich Warburg (Physiology or Medicine)
- 1931 Friedrich Bergius (Chemistry)
- 1932 Werner Heisenberg (Physics)
- 1933 Erwin Schrödinger (Physics)
- 1935 Hans Spemann (Physiology or Medicine)
- 1936 Peter Debye (Chemistry)
- 1939 Adolf Butenandt (Chemistry)
- 1944 Otto Hahn (Chemistry)
- 1945 Ernst Boris Chain (Physiology or Medicine)
- 1949 Walter R. Hess (Physiology or Medicine)
- 1950 Kurt Alder (Chemistry)
- 1950 Otto Diels (Chemistry)
- 1953 Fritz Albert Lipmann (Physiology or Medicine)
- 1953 Hans Adolf Krebs (Physiology or Medicine)
- 1954 Max Born (Physics)
- 1954 Walther Bothe (Physics)
- 1956 Werner Forssmann (Physiology or Medicine)
- 1963 Eugene Wigner (Physics)
- 1969 Odd Hassel (Chemistry)
- 1973 Wassily Leontief (Economics)
- 1991 Bert Sakmann (Physiology or Medicine)
- 2020 Emmanuelle Charpentier (Chemistry)
