= Andreas Maercker =

German psychologist (born 1960)

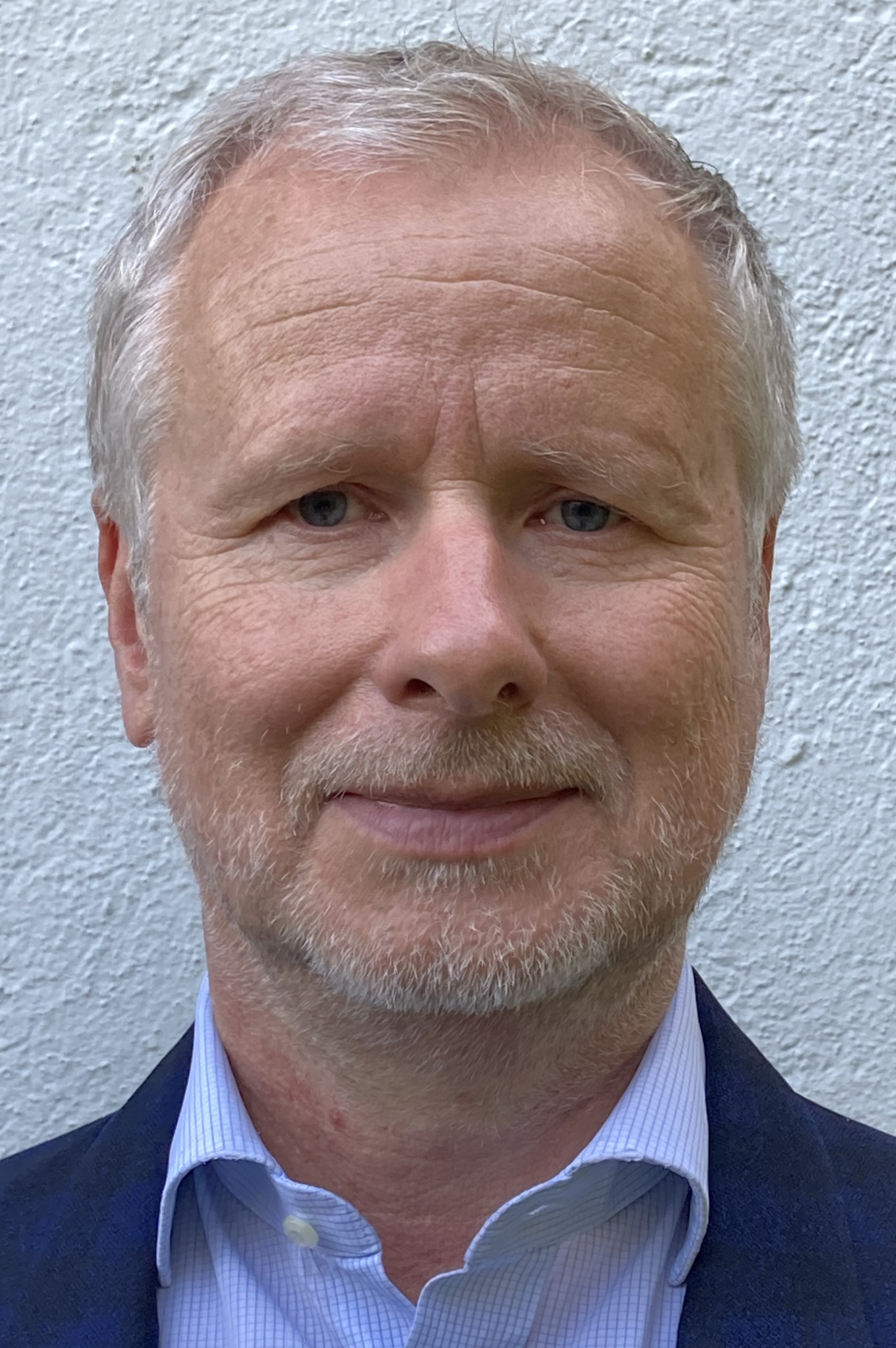
A. Maercker

Andreas Maercker (born 26 April 1960) is a German clinical psychologist and international expert in traumatic stress-related mental disorders who works in Switzerland and since 2026 . He also contributed to lifespan and sociocultural aspects of trauma sequelae, e.g. the Janus-Face model of posttraumatic growth. Recently, he has been increasingly engaged in cultural clinical psychology. Since 2026, he has also been working with an affiliation in Denmark.

== Biography ==
Andreas Maercker studied medicine and psychology in East Germany. He graduated as M.D. in 1986 at the Humboldt University of Berlin. From 1988 to 1989 he was a political prisoner in the GDR for ten months due to an escape attempt to the Federal Republic (sentenced to two years in prison and earlier "redeemed" by the Federal Republic of Germany). In 1995 he graduated as Ph.D. with a study conducted at the Max Planck Institute for Human Development in Berlin supervised by psychologist Paul B. Baltes. In 1999, he became a psychology professor at TU Dresden. Since 2005, he holds the chair of Psychopathology and Clinical Intervention at the University of Zurich. Since 2011, he has chaired the working group "Stress-associated disorders" for ICD-11 revision by World Health Organization. In 1998, he co-founded the German language Society for Psychotraumatology (Deutschsprachige Gesellschaft für Psychotraumatologie) and served as its president. In 2017, he also co-founded the European Association for Clinical Psychology and Psychological Treatment (EACLIPT) and serves as its secretary. Starting in 2017, he is chairperson of the commission "Instrumentalization of Psychology in the GDR" of the German Psychological Society on Stasi psychology..

== Work ==
International contributions of his work are a new diagnosis model of adjustment disorder, the introduction of complex post-traumatic stress disorder and prolonged grief disorder to ICD-11. In PTSD research he developed assessments of socio-interpersonal risk and protective factors: "Disclosure of trauma questionnaire (Dysfunctional disclosure)", "Social acknowledgement as victim", and "Revised Sense of Coherence Scale" that had been translated into Polish, Bahasia Indonesian, and Chinese. Based on these factors he developed the "Social interpersonal model of PTSD". This model posits that social and interpersonal factors play a more central role than biological factors or memory-related alterations. Currently, the model gets extended into cultural factors relevant to PTSD (e.g. values, scripts). With regard to lifespan consequences of trauma he developed the "Janus-Face-Model of posttraumatic growth" (together with Tanja Zöllner). This model differentiates previous uniformly positive models of post-traumatic growth. Other models of mental disorder or phenomena development concern, e.g. the "motivational reserve" (parallel to cognitive reserve) (with S. Forstmeier) of older people which is based on life and learning history resources and is assumed to temporarily compensate for a dementia-induced reduction in intelligence and general abilities. In intervention research, he was one of the early developers of Internet interventions for posttraumatic stress, prolonged grief disorder, adjustment disorder in German language and other languages. In 2020, he was among the 'Highly Cited Researchers' of the year, recognized annually by Web of Science for their exceptional research performance.

In cultural clinical psychology, two topics were in the foreground: the "cultural scripts of trauma sequelae" and "historical trauma" according to the concept of Maria Yellow Horse Brave Heart. For the Global North, these cultural scripts of trauma sequelae are largely congruent with the codified diagnoses of PTSD and Complex PTSD. A parallel study using emic and etic methods, ongoing since 2022, analyzes cultural scripts of trauma sequelae in Switzerland, Rwanda, Georgia, China, and Israel. Historical trauma is operationalized as individual and especially socio-psychological long-term effects, perpetuated by discrimination or marginalization of victims and their subsequent generations. In this area, he and colleagues are conducting comparative studies of trauma in different regions of the world (e.g.). In 2026, Cambridge University Press published a book by him on "Historical trauma", collecting empirical evidence on existing empirical literature on various contexts (including Native Americans, Holocaust survivors, victims of Stalinism, victims of genocide in the 20th century) following the approach of a multi-perspective culture of remembrance.

== Awards ==
- In 2004, the award for Anthropological and Humanistic Psychology by the Margrit-Egnér-Foundation.
- In 2017, the Order of Merit of the Federal Republic of Germany in recognition of his scientific work and working in honorary capacity in psychotraumatology and the clinical care of traumatized persons.
- In 2017, the Wolter de Loos Award for Distinguished Contribution to Psychotraumatology in Europe from the European Society for Traumatic Stress Studies for his scientific work.
- In 2018–2019, Fellow at the Berlin Institute for Advanced Studies.
- In 2025: The Academia Europaea elected him as a member of its section “The Human Mind and its Complexity”.

== Main international publications ==
- Maercker, A., Brewin, C. R., Bryant, R. A., Cloitre, M., Ommeren, M., Jones, L. M., ... & Somasundaram, D. J. (2013). Diagnosis and classification of disorders specifically associated with stress
- Linden, M. & Maercker, A. (Eds.) (2010). Embitterment: Societal, psychological, and clinical perspectives. Wien: Springer. ISBN 978-3-21199-740-6
- Maercker, A. (2017). Trauma und Traumafolgestörungen. München: Beck'sche Reihe. ISBN 978-3-406-69850-7
- Maercker, A., Schützwohl, M. & Solomon, Z. (Eds.) (2008). Post-Traumatic Stress Disorder: A Lifespan Developmental Perspective. Seattle: Hogrefe & Huber. ISBN 978-0-88937-187-3
- Maercker, A., Heim, E. & Kirmayer, L. J. (Eds.) (2019). Cultural clinical psychology and PTSD. Boston: Hogrefe. ISBN 978-0-88937-497-3
- Maercker, A. (Ed.) (2022). Trauma sequelae. Berlin: SpringerNature. ISBN 978-3-662-64057-9
- Maercker, A. (2026). Historical trauma: Psychological processes, contexts, and healing. ISBN 978-1-009-62977-5

== See also ==
- List of recipients of the Order of Merit of the Federal Republic of Germany
