= Louis Borchardt =

- Born: 1816/7; Landesberg an der Warthe, Brandenburg, East Prussia
- Died: 15 November 1883; Fallowfield, Manchester, England
- Resting place: Southern Cemetery, Manchester
- Monuments: Borchardt Ward, Pendlebury Children's Hospital
- Education: University of Berlin, MD (1938)
- Occupations: Doctor, paediatrician
- Employer: Pendlebury Children's Hospital
- Organization(s): Manchester Society for Women's Suffrage; British Medical Association, Manchester Medical Society; South East Lancashire Liberal Association; Manchester Liberal Association

Louis Borchardt (1816/7 – 15 November 1883) was a German-born medical doctor and paediatrician, who became prominent in Manchester. He was an active supporter of suffrage and an advocate for women's equal standing in the medical profession.

== Life ==
Borchardt was born in Landesberg an der Warthe, Brandenburg (then Prussia) and studied medicine at the University of Berlin, qualifying in 1838. He was lauded for his role in the medical relief effort during a typhus epidemic in 1845, but his 'ardent liberal proclivities in politics induced him to take part in the insurrectionary party of 1848', for which he was imprisoned for two years. Upon release, he migrated to Britain.

Borchardt settled in Manchester in 1852, and—according to his obituary in The BMJ—"soon made a mark on account of his knowledge, independence of character, high intelligence, and excellent professional information." The year after his arrival, Borchardt began to work with the Children's Dispensary, which later became the Children's Hospital at Pendlebury, a much-admired institution. Borchardt was Honorary Physician of the hospital and dispensary for a quarter of a century. The 'Borchardt Ward' was named in his honour, and a marble bust of Borchardt was placed in the hospital.

Borchardt was a member of the British Medical Association's Council and became President of its Lancashire and Cheshire Branch. He was also President of the Manchester Medical Society and served on the executive committee of the Manchester Nurse-Training Institution from its founding in 1866.

== Political causes ==
Borchardt was an active supporter of women's suffrage, and it was at his home on 11 January 1867 that the Manchester National Society for Women's Suffrage (MNSWS) was formed. This group included Jacob Bright and Elizabeth Wolstenholme. Borchardt was also Vice President of the Union and Emancipation Society, which called for the restoration of the American Union and the end of slavery in the US. His British Medical Journal obituary described Borchardt as identifying 'throughout his career, with the liberal side of every public question'. It went on:

At the Association meeting in Bath in 1878, he was a convinced advocate for the admission of medical women to an equal footing with medical men in the profession and the Association. He was an active and energetic friend of the organisation of provident medical dispensaries. He never shied away from facing unpopularity and did not hesitate to publicly advocate opinions that he believed to be just and liberal, even in the face of hostile majorities.

Borchardt was active in Liberal politics: President of the Withington branch of the South East Lancashire Liberal Association, and chairman of the St Ann's branch of the Manchester Liberal Association. He also became, in 1860, the first chairman of the Manchester Schiller Anstalt, an Anglo-German gentleman's club whose members included Friedrich Engels. Borchardt was acquainted with both Engels and Karl Marx and is mentioned in their correspondence.

== Death and legacy ==
Borchardt played a significant role in moving the in-patient accommodation of what was then the General Hospital and Dispensary for Sick Children to a healthier rural site at Pendlebury. In 1876, when the new hospital, now the Royal Manchester Children's Hospital, was nearing completion, he intended to retire but was asked to stay on until the new building was opened. The naming of a ward for Borchardt and the placement of his bust in the hospital demonstrated the regard in which his colleagues held him.

Borchardt died at his home in Fallowfield, Manchester, on 15 November 1883. He was buried five days later in the nonconformist section of Southern Cemetery, Manchester. An obituary printed in the British Medical Journal said:

He leaves behind him the reputation of a man of honour, honesty, courage, public spirit, and intelligence. Such characteristics are apt to lead a man through thorny paths, but they also lead him to the goal of duty and usefulness. Dr. Borchardt won the palm he coveted; he lived honoured and respected, and in his death, he leaves a name which his friends and family will long cherish.
