= Pendlebury Children's Hospital =

- Central Manchester University Hospitals NHS Foundation Trust
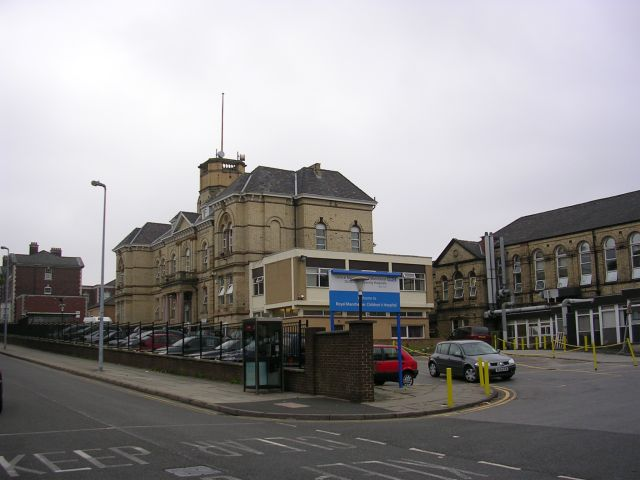
- Pendlebury Children's Hospital

- Shown in Greater Manchester

Geography
- Location: Pendlebury, Salford, England
- Coordinates: 53.5066°N 2.3188°W

Organisation
- Care system: NHS
- Type: Teaching, specialist (paediatric)
- Affiliated university: School of Medical Sciences, University of Manchester

History
- Founded: 1829

Links
- Lists: Hospitals in England

Pendlebury Children's Hospital was a children's hospital in Pendlebury, Salford, England. It was managed by the Central Manchester University Hospitals NHS Foundation Trust.

== History ==
The hospital has its origins in the Dispensary for Children established in Ridgefield in Manchester city centre in 1829. It moved to enlarged facilities with six beds at North Parade in 1853 and to even larger facilities with 25 beds at Bridge Street as the General Hospital and Dispensary for Sick Children in 1858. It moved to its final location in Hospital Road, Pendlebury as the Pendlebury Hospital in 1873. In May 1879 Florence Nightingale wrote to the Secretary of the Hospital praising the structure of the building and asking for contact details of its architect.

Officially it became known as the Manchester Children's Hospital in the early 20th century and it became the Royal Manchester Children's Hospital in 1923. It joined the National Health Service in 1948 and subsequently expanded to 250 beds. However the Pendlebury site was still referred to as the Pendlebury Children's Hospital to distinguish it from Booth Hall Children's Hospital which also became part of the same organisation. After services transferred to the new site for the Royal Manchester Children's Hospital at Oxford Road, the Pendlebury site closed in June 2009.

The site has since been redeveloped by Taylor Wimpey and Barratt Developments for residential use.

== Services ==
The hospital provided regional services in paediatric oncology, surgery, otolaryngology, orthopaedics, respiratory medicine, endocrinology, neurology, neurosurgery, nephrology and urology. The hospital a high dependency and the regional intensive care unit and was internationally recognised for its work with metabolic and endocrine diseases.
