= The Lady from the Sea =

1888 play by Henrik Ibsen

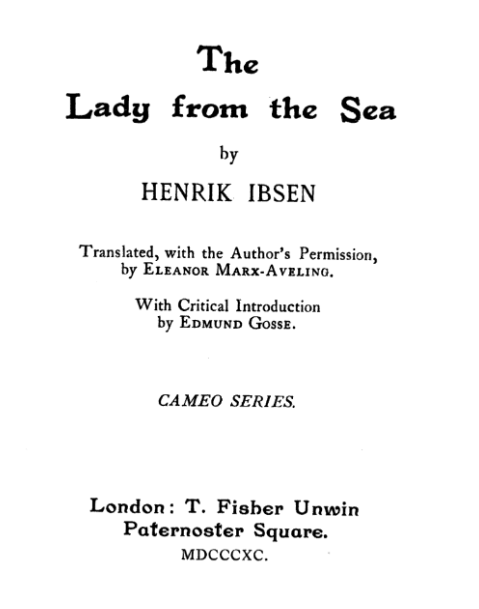
- Title page of the first English edition, 1890
- Original language: Norwegian
- Written by: Henrik Ibsen
- Characters: Ellida Wangel; Dr Wangel; The Stranger; Hilde Wangel; Bolette Wangel; Arnholm; Lyngstrand; Ballestad
- Subject: Marriage, freedom
- Genre: Tragedy
- Setting: A town by a fjord

Premiere
- Date: 12 February 1889
- Place: Kristiania and Weimar (simultaneous Norwegian and German premieres)

The Lady from the Sea (Norwegian: Fruen fra havet) is a play written in 1888 by Norwegian playwright Henrik Ibsen inspired by the ballad Agnete og Havmanden. The drama was first translated in English by Eleanor Marx in 1890. The drama introduces the character of Hilde Wangel who is again portrayed in Ibsen's later play The Master Builder. Hilde Wangel has been portrayed twice in contemporary film, most recently in the 2014 film titled A Master Builder.

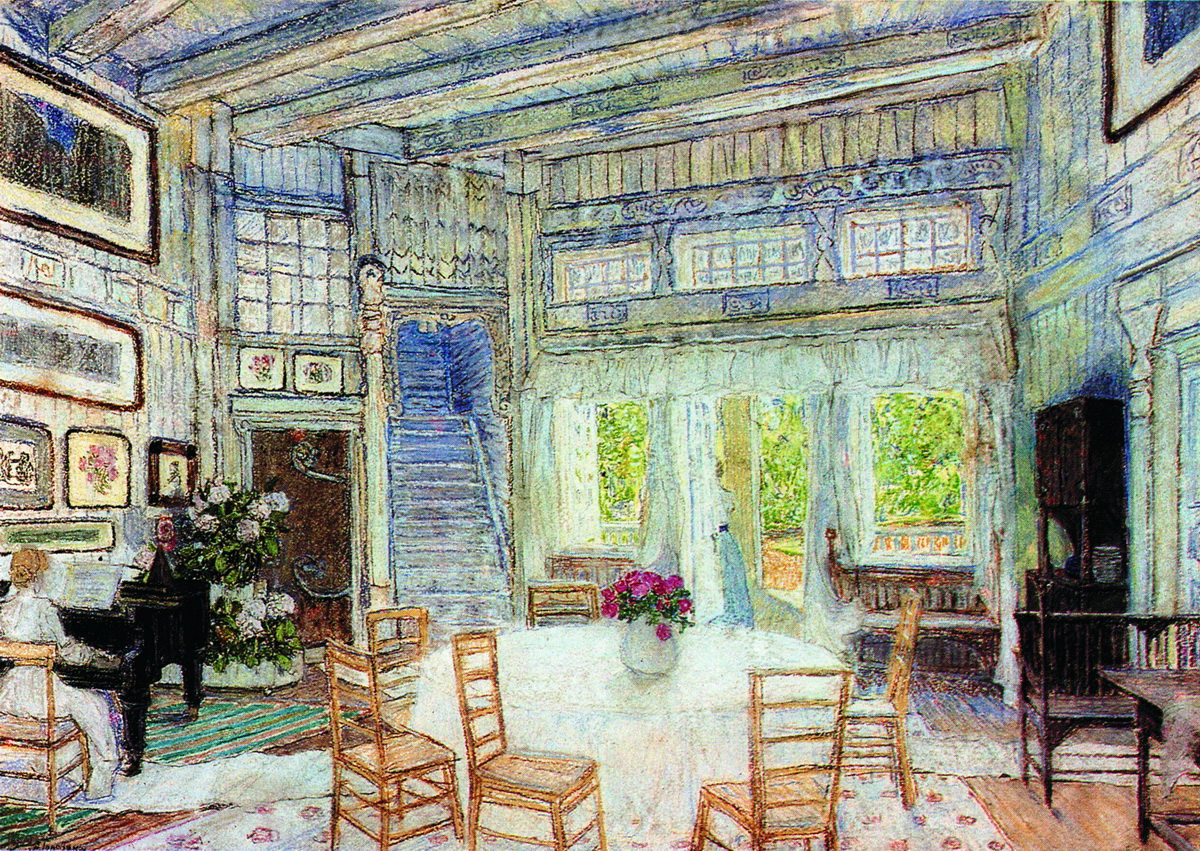

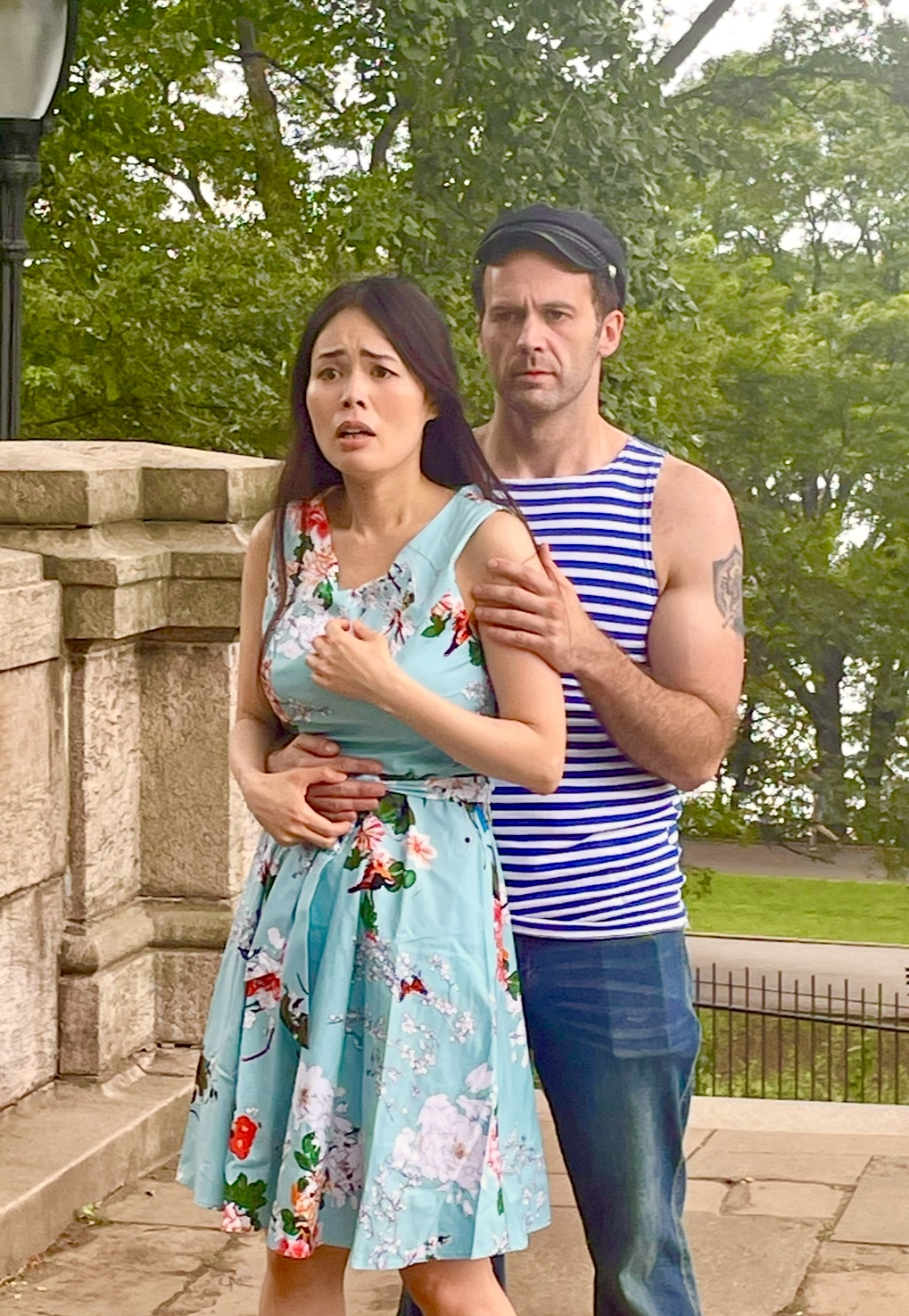

== Characters ==
- Doctor Edvard Wangel
- Ellida Wangel, his second wife
- Bolette, his elder daughter from a previous marriage
- Hilde, his younger daughter from a previous marriage
- Lyngstrand, a dying would-be sculptor and friend of the Wangels
- Arnholm, Bolette's former tutor and possible suitor and Ellida's former suitor
- Ballestad, a painter and friend of the Wangels
- The Stranger, the antagonist, with whom Ellida has a history

== Synopsis ==
The central character, Ellida, is the daughter of a lighthouse-keeper, and grew up where the fjord met the open sea; she loves the sea. Her husband, Doctor Wangel, is a physician in a small fjord town in northern Norway who has two daughters (Bolette and Hilde) by his previous wife, now deceased. He and Ellida had a son who died as a baby. Ellida is restless and troubled by a former romantic attachment. Wangel, fearing for Ellida’s mental health, has invited up Arnholm, Bolette’s former tutor, and a former suitor to Ellida, in the hope that he can help Ellida.

Some years earlier Ellida was deeply in love and engaged to a sailor, but because he murdered his captain he had to escape. Nevertheless, he asked her to wait for him to come and fetch her. She tried to break the engagement, but he had too great a hold over her. The sailor then returns all these years later to claim her. Ellida then has to choose between her former lover or her husband. Dr Wangel finally recognises and accepts her freedom to choose since he comes to realise that he has no other option. This goes in his favour as she then chooses to remain with him. The play ends with the sailor leaving and Ellida and Wangel deciding to take up their lives again together.

== Production history ==
- 1973: The New York Repertory Company performed The Lady from the Sea at the Gotham Arts Centre in New York City. Robert Kalfin directed.
- 1974: Broadcast by the BBC with Eileen Atkins. Repeat showing 1 February 2026
- 1977: The Birmingham Repertory Theatre in Birmingham, England, starring Rosemary McHale as Ellida
- 1979: Vanessa Redgrave starred in Michael Elliott's production with the Royal Exchange Theatre Company at The New Roundhouse in London, England
- 1988: Stan Wojewodski directed The Lady from the Sea at Centre Stage in Baltimore, Maryland, starring Laila Robins as Ellida
- 1990: At the Münicher Kammerspiele Schauspielhaus in Munich, directed by Thomas Langhoff
- 1990: Svein Sturle Hungnes directed at Oslo's National Theatre
- 1994: Lindsay Posner directed at West Yorkshire Playhouse and Lyric Hammersmith, England, starring Josette Simon as Ellida
- 1996: Jackson Phippin directed The Lady from the Sea at the Cleveland Playhouse with Kate Skinner as Ellida
- 2000: Rick Davis directed The Lady from the Sea at Theater of the First Amendment in a new translation by Brian Johnston.
- 2002: Directed by Alfred Christie at the Century Centre for Performing Arts
- 2001: At the Intiman Theatre in Seattle, adapted by Jim Lewis and directed by Kate Whoriskey
- 2006: As part of the Spring 2006 season, Sara Cronberg directed The Lady from the Sea at the Municipal Theatre (Stadsteater) in Stockholm, Sweden
- 2015: At the Shaw Festival The Lady from the Sea was directed by Erin Shields with Moya O’Connell as Ellida.
- 2020: Directed by Leon Mitchell in Kragerø, Norway, starring Katrina Syran as Ellida
- 2025: Simon Stone’s adaptation of “The Lady from the Sea” performed at the Bridge Theatre (London), starring Alicia Vikander as Ellida and Andrew Lincoln as Dr Wangel.
- 2025: Susane Lee's adaptation, directed by Nicholas Martin-Smith, performed at Hudson Classical Theater Company (NYC), starring Aya Ibaraki as Ellida and Drew Brock Baker as The Stranger.

== Adaptations ==
- Kvinnan från havet (The Woman from the Sea) is a ballet by choreographer Birgit Cullberg, and based on Ibsen's play. The ballet was premiered at the Royal Opera, Stockholm, with ballerina and actress Kari Sylwan in the title role.
- Die Frau vom Meere. Schauspiel in 5 Akten is the German language version of the play, translated in 1889 by Julius Hoffory.
- Sounding, a mixed-media performance adaptation of The Lady from the Sea, was performed at the HERE Arts Centre in New York City as part of HERE's annual CULTUREMART.
- Vom Meer. Opera with music by Alexander Muno and a libretto by Francis Hüsers. World premiere: 29 April 2011, Opernzelt, Heidelberg
- The Lady from the Sea. Opera by Craig Armstrong (music) and Zoë Strachan (libretto). World premiere: 29 August 2012, Edinburgh International Festival
- The Lady from the Sea, a BBC Radio 3 adaptation by Frank McGuinness and starring Lia Williams as Ellida, originally broadcast on 1 November 2009 and re-broadcast on 3 May 2015.
- Sagara Kanyaka, Malayalam adaptation of the play, produced by India's Abhinaya Theatre Research Centre and Australian composer Robert Davidson
- The Lady from the Sea by Henrik Ibsen, adaptation directed by award winning British director and author Leon Mitchell. Starring Katrina Syran as Ellida. Produced in Kragerø, Norway by Cinalight Studios in 2020 for international broadcast
