= Internet interventions for post-traumatic stress =

Form of online therapy

Internet interventions for post-traumatic stress have grown in popularity due to the limits that many patients face in their ability to seek therapy to treat their symptoms. These limits include lack of resources and residing in small towns or in the countryside. These patients may find it difficult to seek treatment because they do not have geographical access to treatment, and this can also limit the time they have to seek help. Additionally, those who live in rural areas may experience more stigma related to mental health issues. Internet interventions can increase the possibility that those who suffer from PTSD can seek help by eliminating these barriers to treatment.

Most of the internet interventions for PTSD currently being studied use cognitive behavioral therapy (CBT) tenants to provide treatment. Often these internet interventions also pull from Cognitive Processing Therapy (CPT) and exposure therapy as well. There are two types of internet interventions. Those that are “therapist-assisted,” which means there is an actual therapist guiding the patient through some, but not all of the intervention, and those that are self-guided, which means they do not provide this service. In therapist assisted interventions, patients have access to a live therapist either via video conferencing, instant messenger, or telephone. Therapists can provide feedback to the patient's assignments, and help them process their trauma. In self-guided interventions, patients do not have contact with therapists, unless there is an emergency in which they are a risk to themselves or others. Throughout these interventions, patients are given coping skills and resources. The resources available to patients participating in a self-guided intervention are typically crisis lines, emergency services, and outside sources in which the person can seek help or treatment. The resources provided in a self-guided treatment protocol are not a part of the intervention itself.

While there is a recent shift toward completely removing the need for a therapist in many internet interventions, most of the online interventions currently being researched and used for PTSD still use therapists as part of their protocol. The involvement of the therapist in the intervention varies across interventions. For example, while one study had therapists in direct communication with clients via the Internet every session, another study only had therapists for intake and follow-up purposes. The existing interventions have been shown to be effective in reducing symptoms of PTSD with varying causes such as war in Iraq or miscarriages. This effectiveness is consistent across follow-ups up to a year out from the interventions, but one randomized control trial does report that more structured and highly therapist-assisted interventions are more effective than purely psychoeducational or inspirational interventions.

== Therapist-assisted internet interventions ==
=== High therapist involvement ===
One example of an internet intervention with a high level of therapist involvement is Interapy, which was created and named by Alfred Lange and a team of psychologists at the University of Amsterdam in 2003. Interapy uses a CPT approach and assigns two 45-minute writing sessions each week for five weeks. The writing sessions are assigned via the Internet and guide the participant through three phases of treatment.

The first phase, Self-Confrontation, involves describing the traumatic event in great detail within the writing assignment. This phase is a self-guided exposure to the traumatic event aimed at reducing the avoidance and distress of memories or reminders of the event. The second phase, Cognitive Reappraisal, helps the participant to instill new views concerning the traumatic event. This is achieved by a writing assignment that asks the participants to write a letter with encouraging advice to a hypothetical friend who experienced a similar traumatic event. The last phase of Interapy, Sharing and Farewell Ritual, involves participants writing a letter to themselves or others who were involved in the traumatic event about how the event changed or impacted their lives.

Therapists are highly involved in the entire process of Interapy. They not only customize each writing assignment personally for the participants under their care, but also give written feedback about each assignment turned in by the participants. So far, Interapy shows promising results for participants in the Netherlands, Germany, and Iraq, and has been shown to have positive effects on PTSD symptoms as far as three months from the end of treatment.

=== Medium therapist involvement ===
PTSD Online is an example of an internet intervention that requires a medium level of therapist involvement. PTSD Online was created by Britt Klein and a team of psychologists in Victoria, Australia in 2010. The intervention was a ten-week interactive program that guides the participant through a different module each week.

The first module focuses on psychoeducation about trauma and trauma responses (including stress and anxiety). Modules 2 and 3 are directed at anxiety and stress reduction tools, such as deep breathing and progressive muscle relaxation. Modules 4 through 6 focus on cognitive restructuring and aid the participant in challenging their negative beliefs. Modules 7 through 9 engage the participant in self-guided exposure to images and memories of the trauma. Lastly, the tenth module gives information and tools to prevent relapse into the trauma response.

The therapists involved in PTSD Online have less week-to-week interaction with the participants, as they are not providing feedback to them regarding their progress or adherence to the intervention. Instead, therapists conduct telephone interviews at the start of treatment and then provide audio files unique to each participant regarding their specific trauma that help guide them through the intervention online. Although PTSD Online is no longer live, it showed promising effects early on, with positive treatment effects found at a 3-month follow-up.

=== Low therapist involvement ===
David Ivarsson and a team of psychologists in Sweden created an unnamed internet intervention for PTSD in 2014 that required very little therapist involvement. The intervention is an eight-week text-based intervention that delivers a different module to participants each week.

Within the first module, participants are given psychoeducation about PTSD and are invited to commit to change through a treatment contract. The second module is focused on anxiety coping skills such as controlled breathing or relaxation. Modules 3 through 6 guides the participants through exposures to memories and images of the trauma, using both imaginal and in-vivo techniques. Module 7 focuses on cognitive restructuring and module 8 is relapse prevention.

The structure of the intervention was very similar to PTSD Online, but in this intervention, therapists did not tailor the assignments each week and provided only minimal feedback to participants on their progress. Therapists were, however, available to provide encouragement or help. Again, the intervention showed promising results with significant positive treatment effects at a one-year follow-up.

== Self-guided internet interventions ==
One intervention under development is Coming Home and Moving Forward. This treatment protocol has not been implemented for public use. It was utilized as a randomized control trial (RCT) to investigate if it would be a feasible tool for reducing PTSD symptoms in veterans. This intervention is meant to treat veterans who have recently moved back home from deployment, and have been using excessive amounts of substances. One of the characteristics that sets this intervention apart from other emerging internet interventions, is that it is tailored toward Vets who would rather seek help for their physical complaints, rather than focus on their psychological symptoms. Therefore, primary care providers can recommend it to their patients. This intervention applies CBT tools to treat veterans, which means it focuses on challenging distorted cognitions related to trauma, increasing coping and self-management skills, and preventing social isolation.

The study in which this intervention was implemented utilized veteran feedback 6 months after they completed the protocol. Veterans felt this intervention was ideal for individuals who had been home from deployment for a period of 3–4 months. They did not believe someone who had only been home for month or two would find this intervention useful, because most veterans do not realize something is wrong until they have had time to adjust. Most veterans who participated in Coming Home and Moving Forward thought this treatment would be “a foot in the door,” for veterans who were on the fence about seeking treatment. Due to issues related to stigma, veterans are wary of seeking help. Those who engaged in this online intervention felt it could decrease this stigma and enable veterans to feel comfortable enough in seeking psychological services.

Veterans’ feedback regarding Coming Home and Moving Forward was not all good: there were some downsides to this intervention as well. While most veterans felt this tool allowed other Vets to participate in treatment in the privacy of their own homes, they also felt that sharing their personal information online felt unsafe. Veterans were afraid their identifying information such as their demographics, and their responses to homework assignments would be leaked somehow. Due to this fear, some veterans who participated in the online intervention admitted that they were dishonest throughout some aspects of it. These veterans believed that other Vets participating in this intervention would do the same based on their fears.
