= Booth Hall Children's Hospital =

- Central Manchester University Hospitals NHS Foundation Trust
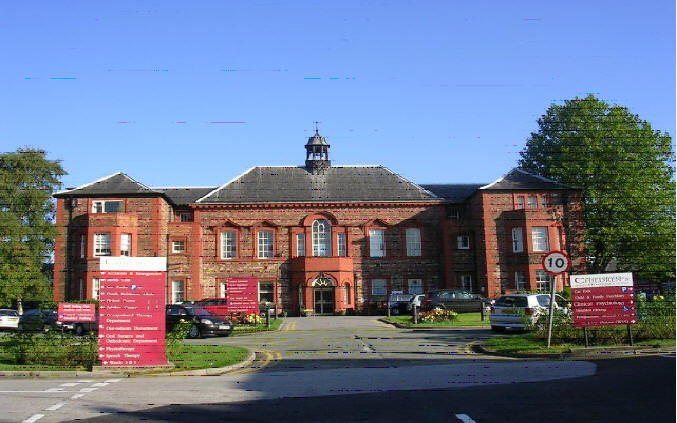
- Booth Hall Children's Hospital

- Shown in Greater Manchester

Geography
- Location: Blackley, Greater Manchester, England
- Coordinates: 53.5236°N 2.2064°W

Organisation
- Care system: NHS
- Type: Teaching, Specialist (Paediatric)
- Affiliated university: School of Medical Sciences, University of Manchester

History
- Founded: 1908

Links
- Lists: Hospitals in England

Booth Hall Children's Hospital was located in Blackley, Manchester. It was managed by Central Manchester University Hospitals NHS Foundation Trust.

== History ==
Booth Hall was built during the early 17th century by Humphrey Booth, a Salford man noted for his philanthropy. The original hall building was demolished in 1907, and the site was acquired by Prestwich Poor Law Union for the construction of a new general-purpose infirmary in 1908. It cared for the poor and the wounded soldiers from the First World War. It reverted to being a children's hospital in 1926. It had 750 beds in 1929 and was the third largest children's hospital in the UK. It incorporated a 102-bed convalescent home. It had 160 tuberculosis beds at a home in North Wales. The infirmary was equipped to give sunlight treatment to orthopaedic cases. The hospital was emptied at the start of the Second World War and made ready for expected air-raid casualties. It joined the National Health Service in 1948.

A renal dialysis unit was opened by Princess Michael of Kent in 1980. After services transferred to the Royal Manchester Children's Hospital, Booth Hall Children's Hospital closed on 12 June 2009.

== Services ==
It provided pediatric specialist services, general pediatric services and had a pediatric accident and emergency department, providing pediatric surgery, orthopedic surgery, plastic surgery and a pediatric burns unit, gastroenterology, respiratory medicine and diabetology. It had a high dependency unit and a transitional care unit for long term, usually ventilated, patients.
