= Julius Hoffory =

Danish-German philologist (1855–1897)

Johann Peter Julius Hoffory (9 February 1855, Aarhus – 12 April 1897, Westend) was a Danish-German philologist, phonetician, and Germanic scholar.

== Biography ==
He studied general and Nordic linguistics at Copenhagen (1873–78), then continued his education in Berlin and Strasbourg (1879–83), receiving his doctorate in 1883 at Copenhagen with a thesis on Old Norse consonant studies. Afterwards he worked as a lecturer of Nordic philology and general phonetics at the University of Berlin, where in 1887 he became an associate professor.

== Works ==
He edited and translated into German some of Ludvig Holberg's comedies under the title of "Dänische Schaubühne" (1885–87), and translated other Danish writings in "Nordische Bibliothek" (1889–91). He did much toward the introduction of Henrik Ibsen in Germany.

- Oldnordiske consonantstudier (1883; Old Norse consonant studies).
- Professor Sievers und die Principien der Sprachphysiologie (1884), an attack on Eduard Sievers.
- Dänische Schaubühne. Die vorzüglichsten komödien des freiherrn Ludwig von Holberg (2 volumes) with Paul Schlenther; German translation of the principal comedies of Baron Ludvig von Holberg.
- Eddastudien (1889).
- Phonetische Streitfragen in the Zeitschrift für vergleichende Sprachforschung, vol. xxiii, an attack on Sievers.
- Die Frau vom Meere. Schauspiel in 5 Akten, (1889). German translation of Henrik Ibsen's Fruen fra havet.
