= List of recipients of the Order of Merit of the Federal Republic of Germany =

This is a list of notable recipients of the top two classes of the Order of Merit of the Federal Republic of Germany.

== Grand Crosses Special Class ==
=== Presidents of the Federal Republic of Germany ===
The President of the Federal Republic of Germany is conferred with the Grand Cross Special Class of the Order of Merit of the Federal Republic of Germany (German: Sonderstufe des Großkreuzes) upon entering office as the ex-officio Grand Master of the order.

- 12 September 1949: Theodor Heuss, President (1949–1959)
- 13 September 1959: Heinrich Lübke, President (1959–1969)
- 1 July 1969: Gustav Heinemann, President (1969–1974)
- 1 July 1974: Walter Scheel, President (1974–1979)
- 1 July 1979: Karl Carstens, President (1979–1984)
- 1 July 1984: Richard von Weizsäcker, President (1984–1994)
- 1 July 1994: Roman Herzog, President (1994–1999)
- 1 July 1999: Johannes Rau, President (1999–2004)
- 1 July 2004: Horst Köhler, President (2004–2010)
- 30 June 2010: Christian Wulff, President (2010–2012)
- 18 March 2012: Joachim Gauck, President (2012–2017)
- 19 March 2017: Frank-Walter Steinmeier, President (2017–present)

=== Foreign recipients ===
==== Known dates ====
- 20 May 1953: Getúlio Vargas, former President of Brazil
- 20 July 1953: Manuel A. Odría, former President of Peru
- 25 August 1953: Juan Perón, former President of Argentina
- 12 September 1953: James J. Norris, American Catholic humanitarian, European Director War Relief Services
- 30 October 1953: Gustavo Rojas Pinilla, former President of Colombia
- 21 November 1953: Carlos Ibáñez del Campo, former President of Chile
- 2 January 1954: Luigi Einaudi, former President of Italy
- 8 March 1954: King Paul I of Greece
- 15 April 1954: Marcos Pérez Jiménez, former President of Venezuela
- 11 June 1954: Adolfo Ruiz Cortines, former President of Mexico
- 12 June 1954: Celâl Bayar, former President of Turkey
- 6 November 1954: Emperor Haile Selassie of Ethiopia
- 11 November 1954: José María Velasco Ibarra, former President of Ecuador
- 13 November 1954: Andrés Martínez Trueba, former President of Uruguay
- 29 December 1954: Óscar Osorio, former President of El Salvador
- 30 December 1954: Víctor Paz Estenssoro, former President of Bolivia
- 3 January 1955: Ásgeir Ásgeirsson, former President of Iceland
- 25 February 1955: Seán T. O'Kelly, former President of Ireland
- 27 February 1955: Shah Mohammad Reza Pahlavi of Iran
- 27 February 1955: Queen Soraya Esfandiary-Bakhtiary of Iran
- 1955: Juscelino Kubitschek, former President of Brazil
- 8 May 1956: Queen Frederica of Greece
- 5 October 1956: William Tubman, former President of Liberia
- 17 October 1956: Theodor Körner, former President of Austria
- 8 December 1956: Giovanni Gronchi, former President of Italy
- 29 July 1957: Manuel Prado Ugarteche, former President of Peru
- 1957: Fulgencio Batista, President of Cuba
- 20 October 1958: Queen Elizabeth II of the United Kingdom
- 20 October 1958: Prince Philip, Duke of Edinburgh
- 28 July 1960: King Bhumibol Adulyadej of Thailand
- 28 July 1960: Queen Sirikit of Thailand
- 1960: Arturo Frondizi, former President of Argentina
- 1961: Charles de Gaulle, former President of France
- 7 August 1963: King Mohammad Zahir Shah of Afghanistan
- 30 October 1963: Sukarno, former President of Indonesia
- 20 November 1963: Diosdado Macapagal, former President of the Philippines
- 20 November 1963: Eva Macapagal, former First Lady of the Philippines
- 1964: King Mahendra of Nepal
- 1964: Queen Ratna of Nepal
- 9 March 1967: Sultan Ismail Nasiruddin, former Yang di-Pertuan Agong of Malaysia
- 9 March 1967: Intan Zaharah, former Raja Permaisuri Agong of Malaysia
- 27 May 1967: Shahbanu Farah Pahlavi of Iran
- 1967: King Hussein of Jordan
- 24 November 1969: Queen Juliana of the Netherlands
- 24 November 1969: Prince Bernhard of Lippe-Biesterfeld
- 17 May 1971: Nicolae Ceaușescu, former President of Romania
- 18 June 1974: Queen Margrethe II of Denmark
- 18 June 1974: Prince Henrik, Prince Consort of Denmark
- 24 June 1974: Josip Broz Tito, former President of Yugoslavia
- 27 April 1975: Valéry Giscard d'Estaing, former President of France
- 19 April 1977: King Juan Carlos I of Spain
- 19 April 1977: Queen Sofía of Spain
- 2 December 1977: King Tāufaʻāhau Tupou IV of Tonga
- 2 December 1977: Queen Halaevalu Mataʻaho ʻAhomeʻe of Tonga
- 10 March 1979: King Carl XVI Gustaf of Sweden
- 10 March 1979: Queen Silvia of Sweden
- 6 June 1980: King Khalid of Saudi Arabia
- 15 July 1980: António Ramalho Eanes, former President of Portugal
- 21 January 1983: François Mitterrand, former President of France
- 1 March 1983: Queen Beatrix of the Netherlands
- 1 March 1983: Prince Claus of the Netherlands
- 1985: Mauno Koivisto, former President of Finland
- 1986: King Birendra of Nepal
- 22 April 1986: Francesco Cossiga, former President of Italy
- 4 July 1988: Vigdís Finnbogadóttir, former President of Iceland
- 1 August 1991: Mário Soares, former President of Portugal
- 7 September 1992: Sultan Azlan Shah, former Yang di-Pertuan Agong of Malaysia
- 1992: Andrew Bertie, former Prince and Grand Master of the Sovereign Military Order of Malta
- 13 September 1993: Emperor Akihito of Japan
- 13 September 1993: Empress Michiko of Japan
- 30 January 1994: George H. W. Bush, former President of the United States
- 18 April 1994: King Harald V of Norway
- 18 April 1994: Queen Sonja of Norway
- 10 July 1995: King Albert II of Belgium
- 10 July 1995: Queen Paola of Belgium
- 2 April 1997: Tuanku Ja'afar, former Yang di-Pertuan Agong of Malaysia
- 30 March 1998: Sultan Hassanal Bolkiah of Brunei
- 15 April 1999: Fernando Henrique Cardoso, former President of Brazil
- 19 May 1999: Guntis Ulmanis, former President of Latvia
- 27 May 1999: Emir Hamad bin Khalifa Al Thani of Qatar
- 14 July 1999: Carlo Azeglio Ciampi, former President of Italy
- 13 October 1999: Eduard Shevardnadze, former President of Georgia
- 6 April 2000: Süleyman Demirel, former President of Turkey
- 9 May 2000: Václav Havel, former President of the Czech Republic
- 7 November 2000: Lennart Meri, former President of Estonia
- 8 November 2001: Guido de Marco, former President of Malta
- 10 December 2001: Tarja Halonen, former President of Finland
- 21 October 2002: King Abdullah II of Jordan
- 21 October 2002: Queen Rania of Jordan
- 17 March 2003: Vaira Vīķe-Freiberga, former President of Latvia
- 6 March 2005: Aleksander Kwaśniewski, former President of Poland
- 25 October 2005: Valdas Adamkus, former President of Lithuania
- 7 April 2006: Marc Ravalomanana, former President of Madagascar
- 27 August 2008: John Kufuor, former President of Ghana
- 26 May 2009: Aníbal Cavaco Silva, former President of Portugal
- 27 April 2010: Amir Sabah Al-Ahmad Al-Jaber Al-Sabah of Kuwait
- 23 April 2012: Henri, Grand Duke of Luxembourg
- 9 July 2012: Albert II, Prince of Monaco
- 28 February 2013: Giorgio Napolitano, former President of Italy
- 8 July 2013: Toomas Hendrik Ilves, former President of Estonia
- 11 July 2013: Dalia Grybauskaitė, former President of Lithuania
- 3 September 2013: François Hollande, former President of France
- 5 May 2014: Miloš Zeman, former President of the Czech Republic
- 25 November 2014: Borut Pahor, former President of Slovenia
- 29 April 2015: Marie-Louise Coleiro Preca, former President of Malta
- 6 March 2016: King Philippe of Belgium
- 6 March 2016: Queen Mathilde of Belgium
- 22 June 2016: Rosen Plevneliev, former President of Bulgaria
- 17 November 2017: Andrej Kiska, former President of Slovakia
- 17 September 2018: Sauli Niinistö, former President of Finland
- 22 February 2019: Raimonds Vējonis, former President of Latvia
- 12 June 2019: Guðni Th. Jóhannesson, President of Iceland
- 19 September 2019: Sergio Mattarella, President of Italy
- 21 October 2019: Giacomo dalla Torre del Tempio di Sanguinetto, former Prince and Grand Master of the Sovereign Military Order of Malta
- 5 July 2021: King Willem-Alexander of the Netherlands
- 5 July 2021: Queen Máxima of the Netherlands
- 10 November 2021: Crown Prince Frederik of Denmark
- 17 October 2022: King Felipe VI of Spain
- 17 October 2022: Queen Letizia of Spain
- 29 March 2023: King Charles III of the United Kingdom
- 29 March 2023: Queen Camilla of the United Kingdom
- 24 May 2023: Klaus Iohannis, President of Romania
- 12 February 2024: Nikos Christodoulides, President of Cyprus
- 18 October 2024: Joseph R. Biden Jr, President of the United States.
- 21 October 2025: Alexander Van der Bellen, President of Austria

==== Unknown dates ====
- Isa bin Salman Al Khalifa
- Amha Selassie
- Empress Kōjun
- Adolf Schärf
- Luis Somoza Debayle
- Ahmed Sékou Touré
- Héctor Trujillo
- Suharto
- Siti Hartinah
- Ólafur Ragnar Grímsson
- Martti Ahtisaari
- Qaboos bin Said
- Hassan II of Morocco
- Baudouin of Belgium
- Princess Joséphine-Charlotte of Belgium
- Paul Biya
- Gustaf VI Adolf
- Ingrid of Sweden
- Park Chung Hee
- Olav V of Norway
- Makarios III
- Raúl Alfonsín
- Paul VI
- John XXIII
- Fania Brancowska
- Arthur Hellmer
- Fadumo Korn

== Grand Crosses Special Issue ==
- 31 January 1954: Konrad Adenauer, former Chancellor of Germany
- 26 October 1998: Helmut Kohl, former Chancellor of Germany
- 17 April 2023: Angela Merkel, former Chancellor of Germany
