= Royal Manchester Children's Hospital =

- Manchester University NHS Foundation Trust
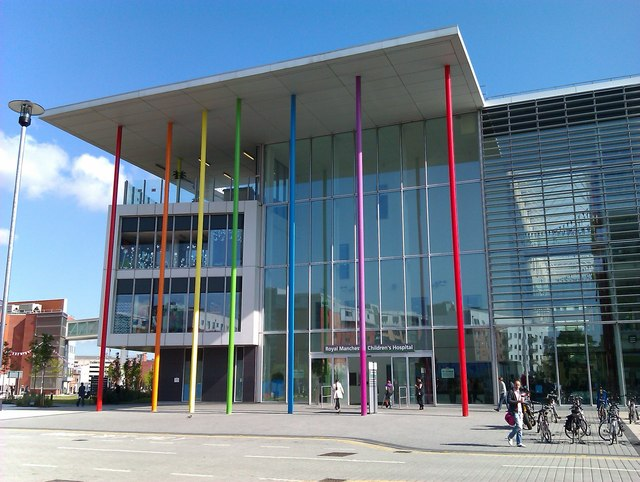
- Royal Manchester Children's Hospital

- Shown in Greater Manchester

Geography
- Location: Oxford Road, Manchester, Greater Manchester, England
- Coordinates: 53.4599645°N 2.2271186°W

Organisation
- Care system: NHS
- Type: Teaching, Specialist (Paediatric)
- Affiliated university: School of Medical Sciences, University of Manchester

Services
- Emergency department: Yes, Paediatric Major Trauma Centre
- Beds: 371

History
- Founded: 2009

Links
- Website: mft.nhs.uk/rmch/
- Lists: Hospitals in England

The Royal Manchester Children's Hospital is a children's hospital in Oxford Road, Manchester, England. The Royal Manchester Children's Hospital is managed by the Manchester University NHS Foundation Trust.

== History ==
A new hospital was required to replace services previously provided by the Pendlebury Children's Hospital at Pendlebury in the City of Salford, Booth Hall Children's Hospital at Blackley in north-Manchester, and neonatal care from Saint Mary's Hospital, Manchester. It was procured under a Private Finance Initiative contract in 2004. The new hospital, which was designed by Anshen & Allen and built by Bovis Lend Lease at a cost of approximately £500 million, was completed in April 2009 and opened in June 2009. In 2013 the hospital carried out scans on Ta-Kr-Hb a mummified Egyptian woman dating from 7th or 8th century BC.

== Services ==
The hospital has 371 beds and with 185,000 annual patient visits making it the largest and busiest children's hospital in the United Kingdom.

== See also ==
- List of hospitals in England
