= Arnold Kutzinski =

German psychiatrist and neurologist

Arnold Kutzinski (17 August 1879, Berlin – 26 December 1956, Jerusalem) was a controversial German psychiatrist and neurologist, known as both an outspoken critic of psychoanalysis and a supporter of eugenics.

He studied medicine at the Friedrich Wilhelm University of Berlin, the Ludwig-Maximilians-Universität München, and the University of Freiburg, where he graduated in 1905.

Subsequently, he became assistant to Bonhoeffer at the Charité psychiatric clinic in Berlin. After World War I ended, he was appointed professor of psychiatry in Königsberg.

In the early 1930s, he immigrated to Palestine and settled in Tel Aviv. He died in 1956 in Jerusalem, aged 77.

Kutzinski was a prolific writer and left a number of works in German and Hebrew on psychiatric and neurological issues. He published i.a. on aphasia, blindsight, headache, war neuroses, hysteria, olfactory hallucinations, eclamptic psychosis. His criticism of psychoanalysis was fully articulated in the 1931 article.
