= Inke Siewert =

German chemist

Inke Siewert (born 5 May 1980) is a professor for Inorganic Chemistry at University of Göttingen. Her research focuses on activation of small molecules by transition metal complexes and molecular electrochemistry.

== Education and professional life ==
She finished her Abitur in 1999. She then studied chemistry at the Humboldt University of Berlin from 1999 to 2004. From 2004 to 2009 she worked on her doctorate in the group of Christian Limberg at the Humboldt University of Berlin. The topic of her dissertation was "Activation of dioxygen at novel first row transition metal complexes for biomimetic oxidation reactions". From 2009 to 2010, she was a postdoctoral research fellow at the University of Oxford in the group of Simon Aldridge. From 2011 to 2013, she was a research fellow at the University of Göttingen in the group of Franc Meyer. From 2013 to 2016, she was an Emmy Noether group leader at the same university. Since 2017, she is a professor in Inorganic Chemistry at the University of Göttingen.

== Awards ==
2016 ADUC Prize

2015 Ernst Haage Award
