= Diana Lange =

German Tibetologist and Sinologist

- Born: 1973 (age 52–53)
- Education: Leipzig University, Tibet University (M.A.), Humboldt University of Berlin (PhD)
- Scientific career
- Workplaces: Technical University of Berlin, Leipzig University, University of Zurich, Museum am Rothenbaum, Max Planck Institute for the History of Science, University of Hamburg, Humboldt University of Berlin
- Thesis: Die Verkleinerung der Yakhautboote. Fischerkulturen in Zentral- und Südtibet im sozioökonomischen Wandel des modernen China [The Downsizing of Yak Skin Boats. Fishing Cultures in Central and Southern Tibet amid Socio-economic Change in Modern China] (2008)
- Doctoral advisor: Toni Huber, Mareile Flitsch

Diana Lange (born 1973) is a German Tibetologist and Sinologist. Since 2025, she has been professor of history and cultures of Central Asia at Humboldt University of Berlin.

== Life and career ==
Lange studied Sinology, Central Asian Studies and Business Administration at the University of Leipzig and Tibet University, completing her master's (Magister Artium) degree in 2002 with a thesis on Hui and Islam in Tibetan settlement areas. From 2002 to 2004, she worked as an associate researcher on the Volkswagen project Ethnology of Everyday Techniques in China at the Technical University of Berlin. From 2005 to 2013, she worked as a research assistant at the Institute for Asian and African Studies at Humboldt University of Berlin, where she received her doctorate in 2008 with a thesis on fishing cultures in Central and Southern Tibet. From 2013 to 2015, she worked at the Institute for Indology and Central Asian Studies at the University of Leipzig with funding from the Gerda Henkel Foundation. From 2015 to 2018, she returned to Humboldt University as a research assistant. She was a lecturer at the Institute for Social Anthropology and Empirical Cultural Studies at the University of Zurich in 2016. In 2018, she habilitated at the École Pratique des Hautes Études in Paris with a thesis on a collection of historical Tibetan maps of the Himalayas in the British Library. From 2018 to 2021, she worked as a research assistant at the Museum am Rothenbaum in Hamburg in the BMBF joint project Coloured Maps. From 2019 to 2021, she worked as a visiting scholar at the Max Planck Institute for the History of Science on the projects Colouring Maps in East Asia and Mapping China in the 18th Century: Hand-drawn Maps from the ‘Qing Atlas Tradition’. From 2021 to 2025, she was Principal Investigator of the project Maps as Knowledge Resources and Mapmaking as Process: The Case of the Mapping of Tibet in the Cluster of Excellence Understanding Written Artefacts at the Centre for the Studies of Manuscript Cultures at the University of Hamburg, before being appointed to the Institute for Asian and African Studies at Humboldt University in 2025.

Lange's research focuses primarily on material and visual cultures, the history of collecting and collections, provenance research, the history of knowledge and science, the history of discovery and colonialism, decolonisation, historical cartography and mapping processes in Central and East Asia, intercultural exchange, the history of transport, economic ethnology and Islam in Central Asia. She is considered world leading in her field of research.

== Publications (selection) ==
- Diana Lange: An Atlas of the Himalayas by a 19th Century Tibetan Lama: A Journey of Discovery. Brill, Leiden 2020, ISBN 978-90-04-41493-8.
- Diana Lange: Die Verkleinerung der Yakhautboote. Fischerkulturen in Zentral- und Südtibet im sozioökonomischen Wandel des modernen China. Harrassowitz, Wiesbaden 2009, ISBN 978-3-447-05903-9.
- Emma Martin, Trine Brox, Diana Lange: Among Tibetan Materialities: Materials and Material Cultures of Tibet and the Himalayas. Heidelberg Asian Studies Publishing, Heidelberg 2025, ISBN 978-3-9888701-5-5.
- Diana Lange, "Benjamin van der Linde: Maps and Colours: A Complex Relationship". In: Mapping the Past. Volume, Nr. 3. Brill, Leiden 2024, ISBN 978-90-04-46735-4.
- Diana Lange, Oliver Hahn: "Colours on East Asian Maps: Their Use and Materiality in China, Japan and Korea between mid-17th and early 20th century." In: Research Perspectives in Map History Series. Brill, Leiden 2022, ISBN 978-90-04-54562-5.
- Diana Lange, Jarmila Ptáčková, Marion Wettstein, Mareika Wulff: Crossing Boundaries. Tibetan Studies Unlimited. Academia, Prag 2021, ISBN 978-80-200-3232-4.
- Diana Lange, Yeshi Lhendup: "Exploring the Legacy of Tibetan Mapmaking: Manuscript Maps from the Harrer Collection at the Ethnographic Museum". In: manuscript cultures. Nr. 24, 2024, ISSN 2749-1021, S. 1–61, doi:10.15460/mc.
- Diana Lange: "Decoding Mid-19th Century Maps of the Border Area between Western Tibet, Ladakh, and Spiti". In: Revue d'Études Tibétaines. Nr. 41, 2017, S. 349–371.
- Diana Lange: "A Unique View from Within: The Representation of Tibetan Architecture in the British Library’s Wise Collection". In: Orientations. Nr. 47(7), 2016, S. 18–25.
