= Noureddin Kianouri =

Iranian politician

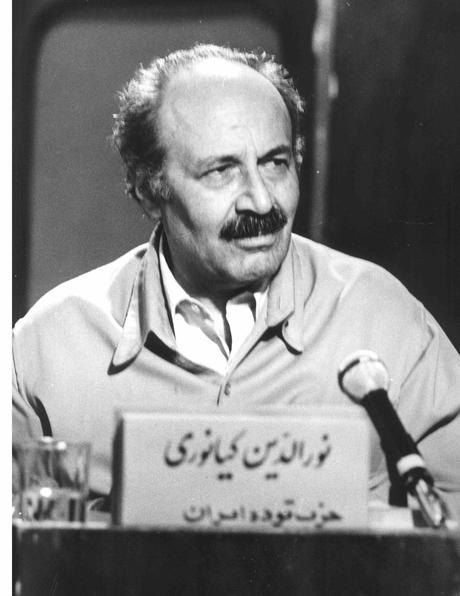
- Kianouri in 1981
- Born: 1915; Baladeh, Mazandaran, Iran
- Died: 5 November 1999 (aged 84); Tehran, Iran
- Other name: Silvio Macetti N. K.
- Education: University of Tehran; Aachen University
- Political party: Tudeh Party of Iran
- Spouse: Maryam Farman Farmaian

Noureddin Kianouri (Persian: نورالدین کیانوری; 1915–1999) was an Iranian construction engineer, urban planner, professor of Bauakademie der DDR in Berlin, and a communist political leader. He studied first at the University of Tehran until 1934 and later in Germany from 1934 to 1939. Before his return to Iran he practiced architecture as well, though he is mostly remembered as a construction engineer in the Munich office of Philipp Holzmann. About a year after foundation of the Tudeh Party he joined the party with the membership number 444 in May 1942. Later he became one of the influential members of the Central Committee for the communist Tudeh Party, Following the 1953 Iranian coup d'état the party was banned and Kianouri was imprisoned. He fled, and lived in Italy and later East Germany; under the pseudonym "Dr. Silvio Macetti" he was an influential architect and theorist of socialist architecture and city planning.

After his second return to Iran following the 1979 Islamic Revolution, he continued his political activities and acted as the Tudeh party's general secretary from 1979 to 1984. Again he came under scrutiny, and again the party was banned. Kianouri was arrested and tortured (and so was his wife), and read a forced confession on national TV. He was released and placed under house arrest, and died on 5 November 1999.

== History ==
=== Family and education ===
Kianouri was born in Nur, Iran Province Mazandaran. he was son of Shaikh Mehdi Nuri Mazandarani and Zahrā Solṭāni Nuri Mazandarani. His grandfather Sheikh Fazlollah Noori, and great-grandfather was Mirza Husain Noori Tabarsi. His father Shaikh Mehdi was assassinated six months before Kianouri's birth (Kiānuri, 1992, pp. 33–36). Dr. Aḵhtar kianouri his greater sister was one of founder of women's organizations in Iran and her marriage in 1925 to the prominent communist Abdossamad Kambakhsh had a lasting effect on kianouri's political orientation. His much older sister Aḵtar, too, later became a prominent member of the Tudeh party (Kianouri, 1992, pp. 38–39). His family connection with Abdossamad Kambakhsh later also facilitated Kianouri's close.

After attending the University of Tehran, he was trained in Germany, and graduated from the University of Aachen in 1939. His thesis was on the Healthcare & Hospital Constructions in Iran. After completing his high school education at Dār al-Fonun (q.v.), Kiānuri entered the Engineering Faculty of the newly founded University of Tehran (see FACULTIES OF THE UNIVERSITY OF TEHRAN) in September 1934 (Kiānuri, 1942, p. 52). At the university, he became acquainted with leftist students and briefly participated in a Marxist reading circle, but he was not affiliated with the “Group of Fifty-Three” (Goruh-e panjāh o se nafar), a circle of leftist intellectuals led by Taqi Arāni (q.v.) that gained much publicity after its members were detained by the authorities in 1937 (Kiānuri, 1992, pp. 55–56). In 1935, Kianouri left Iran for Germany to commence his undergraduate studies in architecture at the Technische Hochschule Aachen (Technical University of Aachen). He initially received financial support from his brother and from a cousin residing in Aachen. After two years of study, he was able to secure a scholarship from the Iranian Ministry of Roads (Kianouri, 1992, pp. 58–59). In November 1938, he received his diploma (HArch, 1368a). Shortly thereafter, he was employed by the Philipp Holzmann Company in Munich, a German firm commissioned to build a new hospital for the University of Tehran Imam Khomeini Hospital Complex -before Iranian Revolution called 1000 beds hospital that is the biggest hospital in Iran- (Kianouri, 1992, p. 59). At the same time, he began working on his civil engineering doctoral thesis "Krankenhausbau für Iran, Der heutige Stand und die Neuordnung der Volksgesundheits-und Kranken-Fürsorge in Iran"”. (The Construction of Hospitals for Iran), which focused on the medical infrastructure in Iran. He successfully defended his thesis at the Technische Hochschule Aachen in September 1939 (Kianouri, 1942, p. 52; HArch, 1368b).

=== Return from German Reich to Imperial State of Persia 1939 ===
In the early 1940s he married feminist and communist activist Maryam Firouz daughter of Abdol-Hossein Farman Farma; at the time he taught structure at Tehran University. Throughout the period he had an active political and professional life, and was one of the few educated Iranian construction engineers and architects in 1940's. He was one of the first members of the Association of Iranian Architects (1945), which was placed in charge of major housing developments in the city of Tehran. The Association put in place the guidelines of the Congrès Internationaux d'Architecture Moderne, and translated them into "building codes, regulations, and protocols that had the fundamental role in shaping the Middle East's first modern metropolis". Kianouri was described as a "key figure", who formulated the organization's theoretical and ideological mission statements. On the political side, he joined the Tudeh Party in 1942 about a year after its foundation, and was a member of the Tudeh Party's central committee in 1945, one of the party's "key figures".

=== Association of Iranian Architects (1945–1949) ===
On 29 September 1941, within a month of Reza Shah’s abdication, a group of recent graduates from European universities and former political activists announced the formation of an Iranian communist party: the Tudeh Party (the Party of the Masses). Besides their political activities in the form of demonstrations and gatherings, they set out to train and educate the public, specifically the working and middle classes. During 1946 the Tudeh Party extended its activities with a view to mobilizing middle-class, working-class, and intellectuals. The mission resulted in the formation of numerous groups, circles, and clubs as sympathizers of the Tudeh Party or associated organizations, namely Women’s Association, Youth Association, Officers’ Organization, Students’ Association, Writers’ Association. They we also interested in The Association of Iranian Architects which role was quite fundamental; the discourse of domesticity was at the centre of their political programme to mobilize urban society, addressing women (workers) in particular as a forgotten half of the active political mass. Their ideology was influential in the design and construction of mass housing projects in Tehran during the late 1940s and 1950s. The association launched its own journal, Architect, in order to reach a larger audience. It soon became quite popular and were distributed countrywide.

The founding members were Mohsen Foroughi (graduate from École des Beaux-Arts in Paris in 1934), Keyghobad Zafar (graduate from Royal College of Art in London 1936), Ali Sadeghe (graduate from Académie Royale des Beaux-Arts in Brussels in 1936),Vartan Hovanessian (Guevrekian's collaboratorand graduate from École Spéciale d'Architecture of Paris in 1923), Manouchehr Khorsand and Abbas Ajdari (both were graduates from École des Beaux Arts in Paris in 1937), Iraj Moshiri and Naser Badie. Kianouri was one of the first members of association. Some of the association figures collaborated with Gabriel Guevrekian or were introduced to his discourse as young students in Europe.

Among the members of Association of Iranian Architects, Kianouri was a key figure that theoretically and ideologically laid out the mission of the association. He was a graduate of Tehran University. A year later he returned to Iran 1940 till 1945. Despite his academic career at the University of Tehran and his professional work as an architect, he was a leftwing activist.

The Association soon became the only organization the systematically criticized, envisioned, and discussed the problems and the possible futures of architectural discourse and discipline in the country. For them the urgent problem to be addressed was housing. In the first issue of the Architect journal (from August 1946), Abbas Ajdari outlined the mission of the association in the article “The Problem of Housing in Tehran, and other Cities”.

Following the enactment in 1944 of the Law of Affordable Housing for Working Class and Governmental Employees initiated in the parliament by the Tudeh Party fraction, the Association of Iranian Architects developed a series of social housing projects in Tehran: the Chaharsad Dastgah (1944–1946), the Kuy-e Narmak (1951–1955), the Kuy-e Nazi Abad (1951–1958), the Kuy-e Nohom-e Aban (1961–1963), and the Kuy-e Kan (1961–1964). The new neighbourhoods were all planned according to the modernist principles of hygienic facilities, sufficient daylight, clean water supply, and vehicular accessibility. The new typologies were collective housing with minimum units. The total areas of these new neighbourhoods combined were more than the size of the city itself.

The industrial areas and factories around the city in order to accommodate the working class. Most of these housing projects were equipped with communal spaces at both the block and neighbourhood scales, where meetings, social exchange, and political gatherings and demonstrations could take place. The initial idea of these projects was to build highdensity quarters with tall slabs. However, owing to a lack of financial support and sufficient executive power to be able to afford and introduce such technologies for large-scale blocks, the Association of Iranian Architects decided to develop the projects with low-tech construction and low-cost building materials and techniques. The plan of the dwelling units was reduced to a bare minimum of spaces, series of bedrooms with almost no living room or spacious kitchen, as used to be the case in traditional Iranian houses. The projects were provided with day-care centres, public laundry facilities, and, of course, community spaces most of which were later converted to Tudeh Party clubs. For them the social, political, and economic performance of the projects was the absolute priority. The ideas for the socialization of the household tasks promoted by Silvio Macetti (Nouredin Kianouri) later in East Germany (GDR) followed designs and typologies of those housing projects in Tehran:

Today we live in a great era; it is the era of revolutionary transformation for the whole society, the age of a worldwide transition from capitalism to socialism. This transformation of the world opens up new perspectives on the spiritual and material conditions of human life….Like every realm of human activity, architecture is also under the decisive influence of these overall processes. As architects and urban planners [our] first and foremost duty is to adapt the built en-vironment of the society to the demands of the socialist way of life….To constantly provide housing for more people and to offer them such a cultural and living milieu as affects the development of individuals as well as society. This [new] form of living must comply with the requirements of our time and the socioeconomic performance of the space in order to foster a high degree of socialization in household tasks. (Noured kianouri, Großwohneinheiten, 1968, p. 8)

=== Assassination, accusations, Arrest and escape from Qasr prison ===
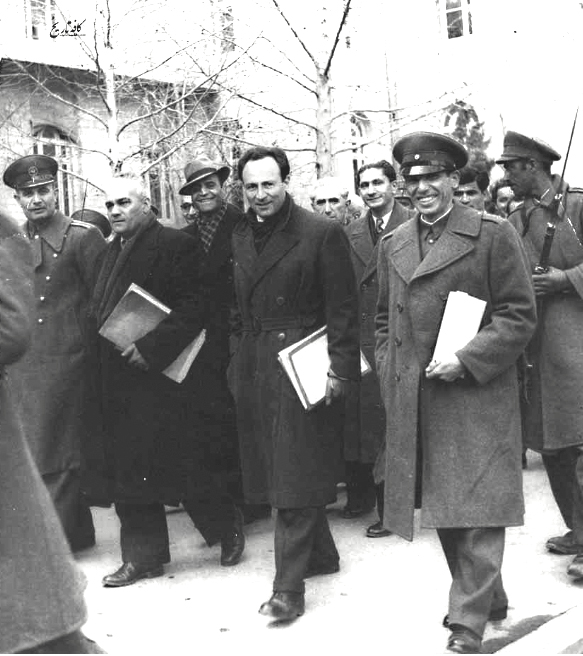
Noureddin Kianouri on the way to court, Tehran, 1949

In February 1949, Kianouri along with other party members were accused of having planned an assassination attempt on Mohammad Reza Pahlavi, the Shah. Later it came to light that Kianouri was aware of the assassination but had not reported the attempt to the central committee. He was sentenced to ten years (his wife was sentence, in absentia, to death). He spent two years in jail and then escaped.

=== Coup 1953 and exile 1955 from Imperial State of Iran to Italy, Soviet Union and East-Germany with new Identity of Silvio Macetti ===
In 1955 two years after the coup 1953 Kianouri ran away from Iran to Iraq and further to Italy communist Party he was given a new identity as Dr. Silvio Macetti. .

He remained active in the Iranian communist party, from abroad. He was one of the "hard liners" in the party, who formed a more dogmatically Marxist faction compared to the moderates, and this faction generally opposed Mohammad Mosaddegh's government. By 1952 the moderates had gained the upper hand and the party did not stockpile any weapons, lest it be seen as hostile to Mosaddegh (according to Kianouri); the party was caught flat-footed when Mosaddegh was overthrown in the CIA and MI6-sponsored 1953 Iranian coup d'état. later 1956 with the new name Silvio Macetti moved to Moscow and one year later to East Germany. In the Soviet Union and East Germany more than others he worked with Josef Kaiser, Bruno Flierl and Georgy A. Gradov (Градов, Георгий Александрович), also an architect and an urban planner. He continued that collaboration after moving to East Berlin, where he became a research director of the Bauakademie der DDR (DBA), developing theories of socialist architecture and urban planning and cooperating with Gradov. He also collaborated with German architect and city planner Bruno Flierl, furthering the work of Gradov. In 1968 he published Großwohneinheiten, which included the strip building as a solution for mass residential construction. A few years later, Gradov published Stadt und Lebensweise (1971). The two never finalized the research project they worked on for decades, and many of the manuscripts proposals were never published. According to Hamed Khosravi, it is not easy to assess how much practical impact their theoretical work had, but it was clear what the essence of the work was: "For Macetti the key to make any social and political change in the society lied in the question of domestic space", less about fulfilling individual necessities, desires, and needs", and more about "the collective mobilization of those lives through maximization of the communal facilities and minimization of the living units to the bare essential infrastructures."

The twenty-year research collaboration resulted in the publication of two books: Großwohneinheiten (1968) by S. Macetti and Stadt und Lebensweise (1971) by G.A. Gradov . Both authors published many journal articles and research reports, a number of which appeared in Deutsche Architektur. However, the joint research project was never finalized: many manuscripts and proposals remained on paper and were never published. Thus, it is difficult to evaluate to what extent such a theoretical project was actually implemented and promoted by the two institutions in planning new settlements and developing architectural typologies for minimum unit and mass housing. However, the migration of the ideas and application of these principles of co-habitation and a new socialist way of living could be traced along with the multi-faceted life of the leading figure.For Macetti the key to make any social and political change in the society lied in the question of domestic space; a space that no more about fulfilment of the necessities, desires, and needs of the individuals, but rather is about the collective mobilization of those lives through maximization of the communal facilities and minimization of the living units to the bare essential infrastructures.

The city and the society indeed were the ultimate targets of the project; where political dimension of life can be exercised. He directly refers to the CIAM principles in his book, and suggests that although they are currently serving the capitalist societies however they could instrumentalised for the mobilization of the society:

Responding to housing demands remains the original task of building science and architecture.

According to the theses of the CIAM, outlined also in the ‘Athens Charter’ in 1933, housing is associated withbe read differently and one of the four major functions of the city: work, housing, recreation, and transport. However the concept of living and housing in the 20th century, as a result of the development of social life, has gone beyond the mere function of the dwelling to which it was formerly limited. Today living no longer encompasses only the private part of human life, but is an essential and dynamic part of the entire system of life. Living no longer takes place in isolated homes, but rather in an active encounter with the associated communities and their facilities (city)….The habitation factors and the material-technical and cultural backwardness of the capitalist past are overcome fundamentally.…:

House should be a space for a meaningful life, for the economy of the time, for reaching a higher cultural level, for better working and living conditions, for emancipation of the woman, for better conditions for the care and education of the children; These are considered by many outstanding architects of the capitalist world as well, and are taken up in their works to fulfil them progressively. This is how the work of Le Corbusier should be understood and judged. (Nourredin Kianouri -Silvio Macetti N.K. - Großwohneinheiten, 1968, pp. 11–13)

Kianouri and his wife were tried in absentia by the regime of Mohammad-Rezā Shāh Pahlavi and sentenced to hard labour for life. As a research director of Bauakademie der DDR in Berlin, he designed a new model for high-rise buildings in accordance with socialist urban development concepts differing from East Germany's Plattenbau concept. His architectural and urban planning designs (GroßWohnEinheiten) were later used as the basis of urban planning in the People's Republic of China. He stayed in East Berlin until 1977, when he was selected as the Secretary General of the Iranian Communist Party.

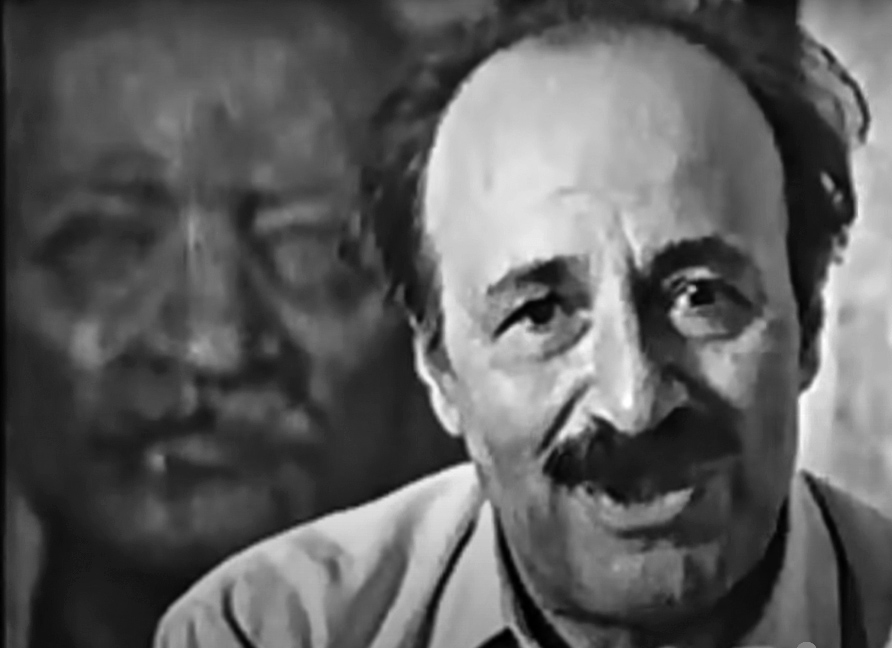
Noureddin Kianouri in the year 1979 in film First Case, Second Case, in the left side sculpture of Nima Yooshij

=== Return to Iran after Iranian Revolution of 1979 ===
The couple of Nourredin Kianouri and his wife Miriam Firouz returned to Iran following the Iranian Revolution of 1979. The Tudeh party was reinstated, and in January 1979, the party's First Secretary Iraj Eskandari was replaced by Kianouri, and for a short period of time the party remained legal; his wife led the Democratic Organization of Iranian Women. The party at that time supported the Iranian Revolution. Kianouri, interviewed for Newsweek, expressed the party's view that it should work with Ruhollah Khomeini, and that "he is playing a totally progressive part in the development of Iran".

=== Arrest 1982, forced confession 1982-90, house arrest 1990-99, and death 1999 ===
In 1982 the Iranian regime received a list of alleged Soviet agents supplied by KGB defector Vladimir Kuzichkin (who had been the Soviet contact for the Tudeh Party) from MI6 and the CIA, possibly so the British could find favor with the Iranian regime. The British also found the repression of the communist party in Iran to be useful. A series of mass arrests followed, including that of Kianouri and his wife; the Tudeh Party was again banned, accused of espionage for the Soviet Union. In February 1983, Kianouri and his wife were imprisoned and later forced to publicly confess on a televised broadcast at the height of the persecution of communists in Iran.

The public confession happened in May 1983, when Kianouri and Behazin, a well-known writer and translator and member of the Tudeh party, appeared on national television, each giving a recantation that was a kind of "history lesson", in which they outlined how communism had betrayed the people of Iran. Kianouri mentioned how he had come to realize that communism was essentially alien to the people of Iran, and that the party was plagued by private jealousies and corruption. Throughout his presentation he kept his hands under the table: it had been broken during interrogation. (In 1995, he testified to the United Nations Human Rights Commission, denouncing "the torture and other inhumane practices carried out in the Islamic Republic's prisons".) His wife, who had fallen ill during solitary confinement, was released on medical ground and placed under house arrest; he joined her a year later, on the condition that he remain quiet to the media. Later, "in an open letter to Khomeini, Kianouri recorded a horrific catalogue of maltreatment and tortures meted out to him and his wife during their imprisonment". He died in 1999.

== Bibliography ==
=== Some Architecture articles & -books of Noureddin Kianouri in Persian Language ===
- 1946, Reconstruction of Buildings in Soviet Union. "Tajdid Sakhteman-haye Kharab Shode dar Etehad Jamahir Shoravi" Arshitekt, 1(2), 58–63. Tehran" (Реконструкция зданий в Советском Союзе После второй мировой войны 1941–44)
- 1950, Buildings of "Health care" Noureddin Kianouri Tehran.

=== Some Architecture articles & -books of Noureddin Kianouri in German and Russian Language (Noureddin Kianouri Wrote under a Pseudonym of Silvio Macetti N. K.) ===
- 1338, Krankenhausbau für Iran, Der heutige Stand und die Neuordnung der Volksgesundheits-und Kranken-Fürsorge in Iran.
- 1960, Медицинские центры и районные больницы Сильвио Масетти Н.К. (Нуреддин Киянури), Кумпан П., Macetti S. und Kumpan P. Medizinskije zentry i rajonnyie bolnizy (Medizinische Zentren und Kreiskrankenhauser)
- 1961, "Forschungskomplex zur »Herausbildung sozialistischer Wohnverhältnisse und zur Entwicklung des Lebensraumes im entwickelten gesellschaftlichen System des Sozialismus" FDJ-Wettbewerb "Haus der Zukunft" (1961) Bruno Flierl und "Silvio Macetti" (Noureddin Kianouri), Free German Youth Architectural design competition "Future house" (1961).
- 1964 (1964) Das industrielle Bauen und die Gestaltung der Fassade, Erfahrungen aus dem Ausland, Noureddin Kianouri Under A Pseudonym of Dr. Ing. Silvio Macetti 7/1964 Deutsche Architektur VEB Verlag für Bauwesen Berlin(N.K.).
- 1965, "Grosswohneinheiten-Article" 10/1965 Deutsche Architektur VEB Verlag für Bauwesen Berlin, 1965, "Noureddin Kianouri" under codename Dr. "Silvio Macetti".
- 1966, Artikle "Bemerkungen zu dem Beitrag, Grosswohneinheiten" von Noureddin Kianouri under codename "Dr. Macetti" [Diskussionsbeitrag], in 18. Plenartagung der Deutsche Bauakademie Berlin Deutsche Architecture 1966, S. 79–81.
- 1966, Zeit und Raum – Entscheidende Faktoren der künftigen Entwicklung der sozialistischen Architektur.In: Deutsche Architektur (1966), H. 1, S. 10–11, Noureddin Kianouri Under A Pseudonym of Dr. Ing. Silvio Macetti .
- 1967, "Konzeption NK — ein Vorschlag für den industriellen Wohnungsbau" Noureddin Kianouri under codename "Silvio Macetti" Deutsche Architektur 3/1967,.
- 1956-1966, "Großwohneinheiten" Noureddin Kianouri Under A Pseudonym of "Macetti, Silvio. N.K." VEB für Bauwesen.
- 1968, "Wohnhochhäuser" Noureddin Kianouri under codename "Macetti, Silvio" Zeitschrift Deutsche Architektur 8/1968.
- 1968, "Probleme des Wohnungsbaus" Noureddin Kianouri under codename "Macetti, Silvio" Zeitschrift Deutsche Architektur 10/1968.
- 1968, "Berlinerinnen Und Berliner Wohnen wir nur in der Wohnung?" Noureddin Kianouri under codename "Macetti, Silvio" Zeitschrift ND Neues Deutschland Neues Deutschland Organ Des Zentral Kommititees der Sozialistischen Einheitpartei Deutschland 10/1968.
- 1968, Bruno Flierl Zusammen mit Silvio Macetti. Bemerkungen zu dem Buch „Stadt und Lebensweise“ von G.A. Gradow(Moskau). 12. September 1968 1968/13.
- 1969, "Ein Aktuelles Problem-Grosswohneinheiten" Deutsche Architektur Band 18 ausgabe 7-12 Deutsche Bauakademie, Bund Deutsche Architekten, original von: Pennsylvania State University digitalisiert 21.sep.2010. "Noureddin Kianouri" under codename Dr. "Silvio Macetti".
- 1969, Vgl. Barch, DY 34/10771, Bundesvorstand des FDGB Free German Trade Union Federation– Abteilung Sozialpolitik, Gewerkschaftliche Sozialpolitik, Arbeits- und Lebensbedingungen, Wohnungsbau und Verteilung des Wohnraums: Grundsätzlicher Standpunkt der Gewerkschaften zu den perspektivischen und prognostischen wohnungspolitischen Aufgaben zur weiteren Entwicklung sozialistischer Wohnbedingungen. Thema 7 des Forschungsplanes des Bundesvorstandes des FDGB, Februar 1969, 173 Seiten, darin: Silvio Macetti, Standpunkt der Gewerkschaften zur Herausbildung sozialistischer Wohnverhältnisse und zur Entwicklung des Lebensraumes im entwickelten gesellschaftlichen System des Sozialismus, S. 41–90.
- 1970, "Die weitere Entwicklung der sozialistischen Lebensweise und das Problem des städtischen Personenverkehrs" Noureddin Kianouri under codename "Silvio Macetti" Deutsche Architectur Juli 1970.
- 1970, Sozialistische Architektur kontra Konvergenztheorie, Heinz Heuer. Umfrage: Perspektiven der sozialistischen Architektur, Edmund Collein u. a. Bernhard Geyer, Noureddin Kianouri under codename Dr. Silvio Macetti, Otto Patze Helmut Trauzettel. Zeitschrift Deutsche Architektur 8/1970.
- 1971, Ökonomie der Stadt und komplexe Ökonomie des Städtebaus, "Noureddin Kianouri" under codename Dr. "Silvio Macetti" Zeitschrift Deutsche Architektur 10/1971, .
- 1971, Сильвио Масетти - Крупные жилые комплексы Издание: Издательство литературы по строительству, Москва, 1971 Объем: 185 стр.
- 1972, Wo steht mein Bett im Jahre 2000? "Noureddin Kianouri" under codename Dr. "Silvio Macetti" Zeitschrift "form+Zweck", .
- 1972, Ökonomie der Freizeit und Stadtgestalt — Silvio Macetti (Berlin).
- 1968-1978 "Skizze einer Problemstellung für die Ausarbeitung einer Wissenschaftlichen Prognose der entscheidenden Entwicklungstendenzen des Städtbaus und der Architektur bis zum Jahre 2000 und darüber hinaus, Deutsche Bauakademie zu Berlin, Wissenschafliche Direktion, Abteilung Prognose (unv. Mat.)", "Noureddin Kianouri" under codename Dr. "Silvio Macetti".
- 1979, "Die komplexe Ökonomie der baulich-räumlichen Umwelt" Noureddin Kianouri under codename Dr. "Silvio Macetti", DH2/21675 Bundes Archive.

== Some Architecture articles & -books about Noureddin Kianouri ==
- Iran Ministry of Information; Khatirat-i Nur al-Din Kianuri [Memoirs of Nur al-Din Kianuri]. Tehran: Didgah Institute. 1992.,

Party political offices
Preceded by Iraj Eskandari	First Secretary of the Tudeh Party of Iran; 1979–1984	Succeeded by Ali Khavari
Preceded by Abdolsamad Kambakhsh	Second Secretary of the Tudeh Party of Iran; 1971–1979	Succeeded by Farajollah Mizani
