= Óváros =

Óváros or Pentele is the central district of Dunaújváros in Hungary. Ráctemplom, a Roman Catholic church is located here. Rácdomb Petőfi Sándor, Attila Streets, Sasberc, Óváros központ, Street Molnár Farkas, the Isle of Szalk, and territory near Danube belong here. The latter includes Felső-fok, Street Magyar, the ex-barracks of the Soviets, and Őrhegy. Buildings here save the history of Pentele. Fences shows some parts of the national culture.

== History ==
There are some findings dating back to prehistory. There are human settlements here dating back 10,000 years. Loess was a very useful material for digging swales for living. In 434, the Huns reached an agreement with the Romans and occupied Pannonia. Ostrogoths and Avars later came to the area.

There is an Eastern Catholic monastery. Rávdomb was built at the same time, and then it was called Dunapentele.

There was built a hill fort here during the Middle Ages during the reign of Anjou dynasty in Hungary. Its original name (Pentele) may have Greek origin. There was a village around the fort. The church was rebuilt as the center of the parish. It is known today as Ráczdomb. In 1526, after the Battle of Mohács, both the Hungarian and the Ottoman Armies crossed the village. There was built a Pfostenschlitzmauer here.

Temporally, it was an inhabited region during the Ottoman rule in Hungary. As a result of the Peace of Vasvár, Rascians settled here. In the 18th century, the Ottomans left Pentele, and Serbs came here as residents. The current Baroque structure of the Greek church is from 1748. When the number of Rascians decreased, the owner of the village, József Rudnyánszky in 1743 settled here Hungarian serfs.

In 1833, it gained the status of market town, and there were markets held here every week. The Hungarian Revolution of 1848 had numerous victims from the town.

In 1870, it became a village, though pharmacy and veterinary physician, and its population significantly grew. During the Second World War 110 houses were destroyed by bombings. The construction of Route 6 improved the economy of the settlement.
