= Jay Rutherford =

Canadian graphic designer

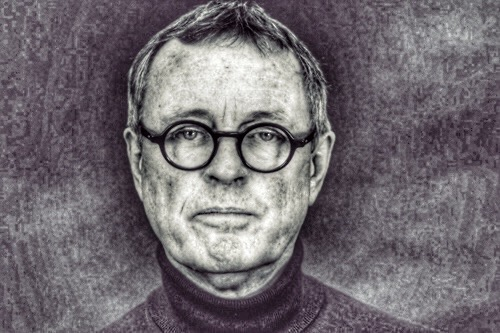
- Born: 1 September 1950 (age 75)
- Occupations: Graphic Designer, Type Designer
- Years active: 1972 – present

Jay Rutherford is a Canadian graphic designer who was for 23 years professor of Visual Communications at the Bauhaus-Universität Weimar, now retired but active. Before moving to Germany in 1993, he worked in various graphics-related positions, including production, as well as design activities. He operated a design studio with partner Elizabeth Owen (Rutherford/Owen Design and Illustration) in Halifax (Canada) for several years. Jay has been teaching part and/or full time since his first teaching gig in 1972, including in, as well as Canada, the United States, the UK, France, Italy, India, and China and continues to do so. He has presented at many symposia and conferences around the world, i.e.: USA, UK, Argentina, India, Italy, China, and Japan.

== Notable works ==
While working with MetaDesign in 90s, Jay helped in expanding the Meta type family and drew an italic for Frutiger Condensed, which FontShop now sells as FF Transit. This typeface is seen on directional signs by anyone who uses public transit in Berlin.
