= Association of Iranian Architects =

Iranian Association

The Association of Iranian Architects was founded in 1945. It was placed in charge of major housing developments in the city of Tehran. The Association put in place the guidelines of the Congrès Internationaux d'Architecture Moderne, and translated them into "building codes, regulations, and protocols that had the fundamental role in shaping the Middle East's first modern metropolis".

Its role was important: Tehran had been in a process of modernization since the 1920s, and after World War II domesticity, and the place of women in society, was front and center. The AIA was responsible for building mass housing projects. It started a journal, Architect.

Founding Members

- Mohsen Foroughi
- Keyghobad Zafar
- Vartan Hovanessian
- Ali Sadeghe
- Manouchehr Khorsand
- Abbas Ajdari
- Naser Badie
- Iraj Moshiri
