= Women's Party of Iran =

Organization founded in 1942

The Women's Party of Iran (Ḥezb-e zanān-e Īrān) was an organization for women's rights in Iran, founded in 1942.

== History ==
In 1941, when Shah Reza Pahlavi was deposed in favor of his son, the Kashf-e hijab stopped being enforced, and the Islamic conservatives in the shape of the organization Devotees of Islam (Fedāʾīān-e Eslām; q.v.) demanded the retraction of the reforms of women's rights and the introduction of mandatory hijab, since many women continued to appear unveiled. In parallel, many groups to the political left as well as liberals in the National Front supported a continuation of the reform of women's rights. This was a critical period of modernization as well as conservative reaction in regard to women's rights, and many new women's groups were founded, of which the Women's Party of Iran was one of the most prominent.

The Women's Party of Iran was founded in 1942 with Ṣafīya Fīrūz and chairman and Fāṭema Sayyāḥ as the editor of its magazine Zanān-e Īrān. The Women's Party supported modernization, a higher status for women, education for women, and was perhaps the first women's organization in Iran to actively support women's suffrage. When a reform of the election system was debated in the Majlis in 1944, the Women's Party of Iran actively campaigned in support of women's suffrage to be included in the electoral reform. It campaigned in favor of women's suffrage alongside the Democratic Organization of Iranian Women (Jāmeʿa-ye demokrāt-e zanān), the women's branch of the Tudeh Party of Iran. The Democratic Society of Women managed to have a suggestion of women's suffrage put before the Majilis in 1944, but it was defeated by the religious conservatives. Women's suffrage was not to be introduced until the 1963 Iranian referendum.

In 1946, the Women's Party of Iran was transformed in to the Iranian Women's Council (Šūrā-ye zanān-e Īrān), which was apolitical in order to attract women with different political opinions.
