= Maryam Farman Farmaian =

Iranian politician (1913–2008)

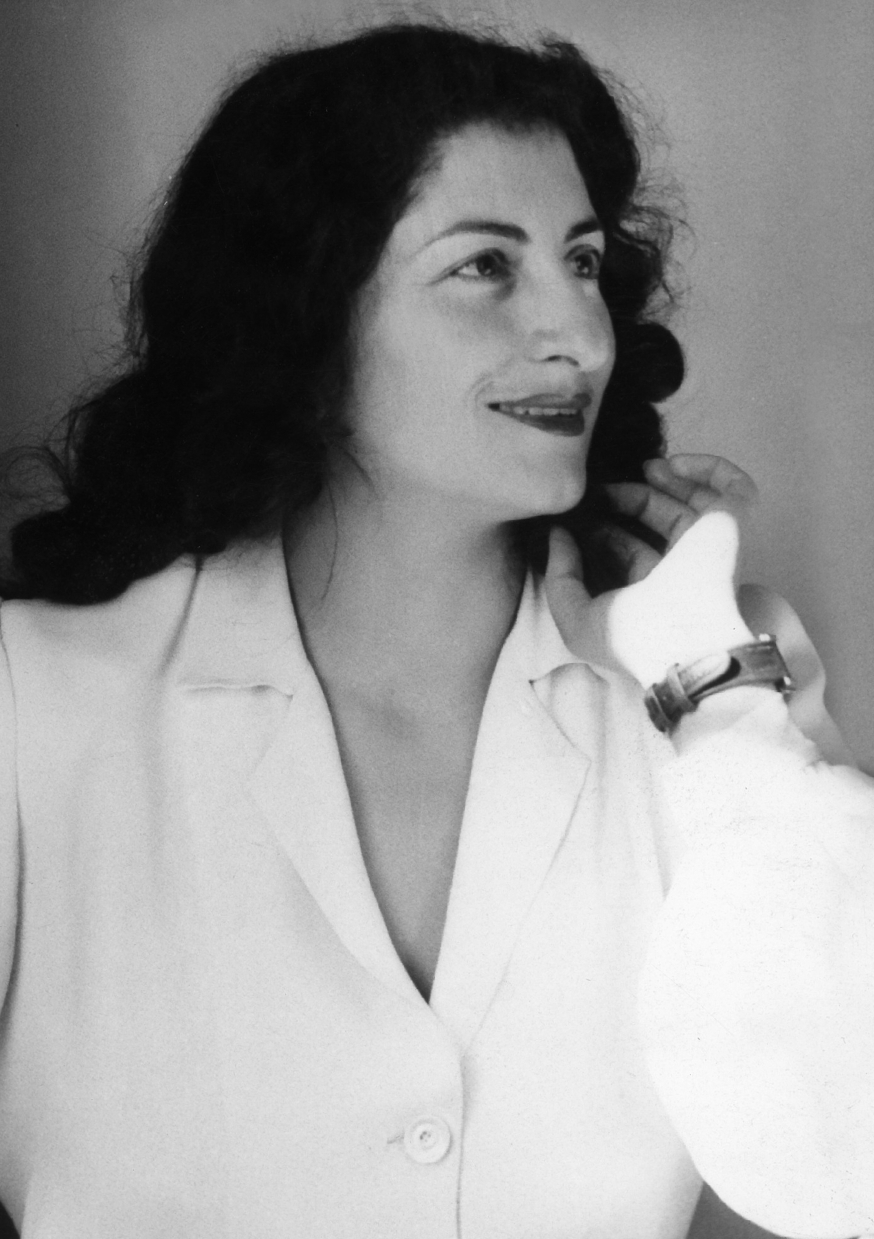
- Maryam Farman Farmaian in the early 1950s
- Born: 1913; Kermanshah, Iran
- Died: 23 March 2008 (aged 93–94); Tehran, Iran
- Other name: Mariam Firouz
- Political party: Tudeh Party of Iran
- Spouse(s): Abbassgholi Esfandiary; Noureddin Kianouri
- Parents: Abdol Hossein Mirza Farmanfarma (father); Batoul Khanoum (mother)
- Family: Qajar

Maryam Firouz (Persian: مریم فیروز) or Maryam Farman Farmaian (Persian: مریم فرمانفرمائیان; 1913, in Kermanshah, Iran – 23 March 2008, in Tehran, Iran) was an Iranian politician. She was a daughter of Prince Abdol-Hossein Farman Farma and Batoul Khanoum. She founded the women's section of the Tudeh (communist) party of Iran.

== Biography ==
She received a liberal education for the Iranian women of her time, and attended university later in life while living in exile. She was a linguist, fluent in Kurdish, Persian, Arabic, French, Russian, German, and English. An independent thinker, she appreciated communist theory. Later in life she said that the reason she chose to become a member of the Tudeh party was that when she decided to actively engage in the women's rights movement, the only party who was willing to accept her [as a woman] and give her a chance to do something at that time was the Tudeh Party. Maryam chose to use the surname Firouz in her political struggles; her grandfather's name. She became known as Maryam Firouz in the political arena. She retained her legal name as Maryam Farman Farmaian with pride.

She first married General army Abbassgholi Esfandiary [son of Mohtashem Saltaneh] in a marriage arranged by her father. They had two daughters, Afsaneh and Afsar. They divorced on the death of her father. In 1949 Maryam married Noureddin Kianouri, a member and later general secretary of the Tudeh Party of Iran.

In cooperation with Noureddin Kianouri, Farman Farmaian established a women's division of the Tudeh Party. Following the attempted assassination of Mohammad Reza Shah on 4 February 1949, the Tudeh party was blamed and her husband was imputed to have been one of the masterminds of the operation. She and her husband were forced into exile in 1956. She started her life in exile in the USSR and then lived in East Berlin, in the former German Democratic Republic. During her years of exile she completed her university studies and later taught French in the universities of Leipzig and Berlin.

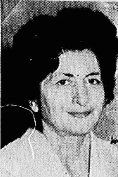
Photograph of Maryam in the Mardom newspaper, 1979

The couple returned to Iran following the 1979 Islamic Revolution and the deposition of the Shah. The Tudeh party was reinstituted with Noureddin Kianouri as General Secretary. In 1983, the Tudeh Party was again banned following accusations of espionage for the Soviet Union. Noureddin Kianouri and Farman Farmaian were imprisoned. Maryam Firouz spent all of her imprisonment in solitary confinement. She was the only member of the Tudeh Party's imprisoned leadership who did not make a forced confession on TV at the time. She was released from prison in 1994 and placed under house arrest for a couple more years before being released to the custody of her eldest daughter in Tehran.

After his release in the mid 1990s, Kianouri wrote an open letter detailing the torture of himself and his wife while in prison. Dr. Noureddin Kianouri died on 5 November 1999.

Maryam Farman Farmaian, a.k.a. Maryam Firouz, died in Tehran on 23 March 2008 and was buried at Behesht-e Zahra. She was survived by her biological grandchildren (Afsaneh's) Ali, Nilou and Firooz, and (Afsar's) Faranak and Roshanak.

Party political offices
New title	Chairwoman of the Democratic Organization of Iranian Women; 1943–1948	Succeeded by Homa Houshmand-Rad
