= Bauhaus University of Weimar =

Public university in Weimar, Germany

Bauhaus-Universität Weimar
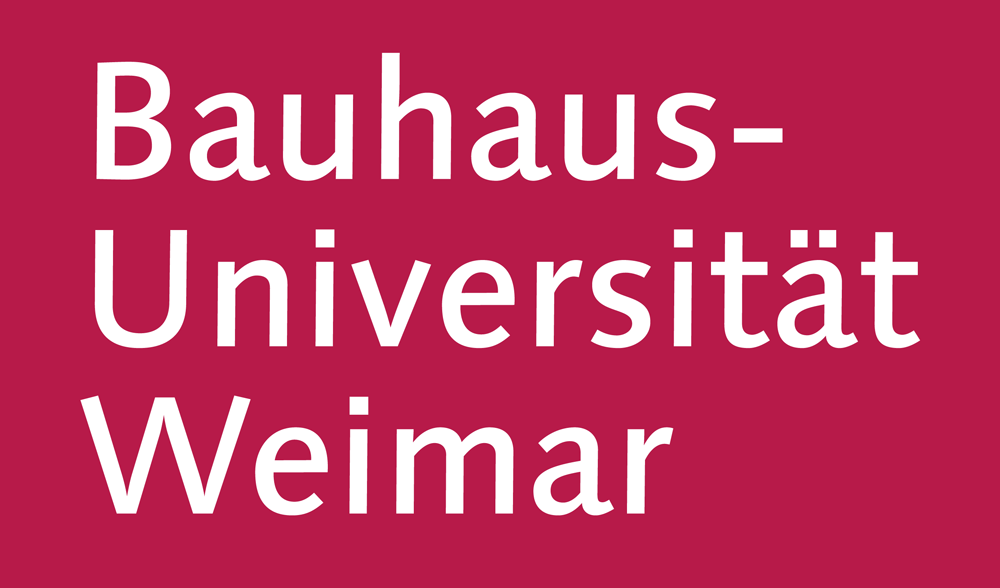
- Former names: Kunstschule (1860); Staatliches Bauhaus (1919); Hochschule für Architektur und Bauwesen (1954)
- Motto: Thinking differently together
- Type: public
- Established: 1860; 166 years ago
- President: Peter Benz
- Students: 4,166 (2021)
- Location: Weimar, Thuringia, Germany; 50°58′28″N 11°19′42″E
- Website: uni-weimar.de

The Bauhaus-Universität Weimar (Bauhaus University of Weimar or Bauhaus University of Weimar in English) is a university located in Weimar, Germany, and specializes in the artistic and technical fields. Established in 1860 as the Great Ducal Saxon Art School, it gained collegiate status on 3 June 1910. In 1919 the school was renamed Bauhaus by its new director Walter Gropius and it received its present name in 1996. There are more than 4000 students enrolled, with the percentage of international students above the national average at around 27%. In 2010 the Bauhaus-Universität Weimar commemorated its 150th anniversary as an art school and college in Weimar.

In 2019 the university celebrated the centenary of the founding of the Bauhaus, together with partners all over the world.

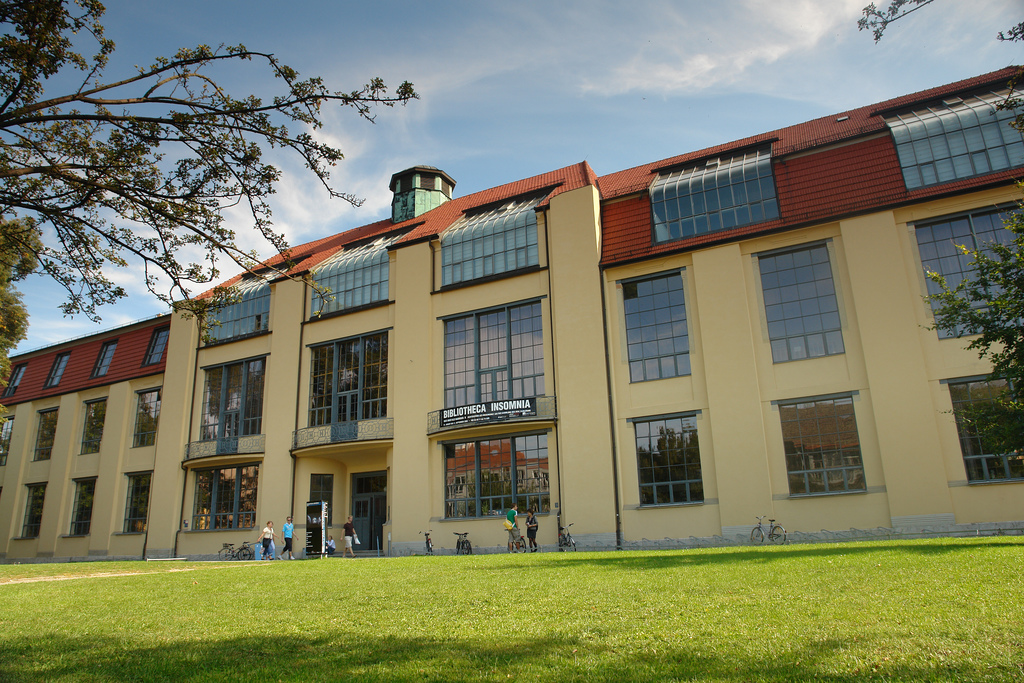
The main building of the Bauhaus-Universität (built 1904–1911, designed by Henry van de Velde to house the sculptors' studio at the Grand Ducal Saxon Art School. Inscribed as part of the Bauhaus World Heritage Site in 1996).

== Academic tradition in Weimar ==
Weimar boasts a long tradition of art education and instruction in the areas of fine art, handicrafts, music and architecture. In 1776 the Weimar Princely Free Zeichenschule was established, but gradually lost significance after the Grand Ducal Saxon Art School was founded in 1860. The Free Zeichenschule was discontinued in 1930. In 1829 the architect Clemens Wenzeslaus Coudray established the Free School of Trades (which later became the Grand Ducal Saxon Architectural Trade School, or State School of Architecture), which operated in the evenings and Sundays and supplemented the courses at the Free Zeichenschule. In 1926, the school was incorporated into the Gotha School of Architecture.

The Orchestra School, which opened in 1872, eventually became the College of Music Franz Liszt in Weimar.

== History of the university ==
=== Art School and School of Arts and Crafts ===
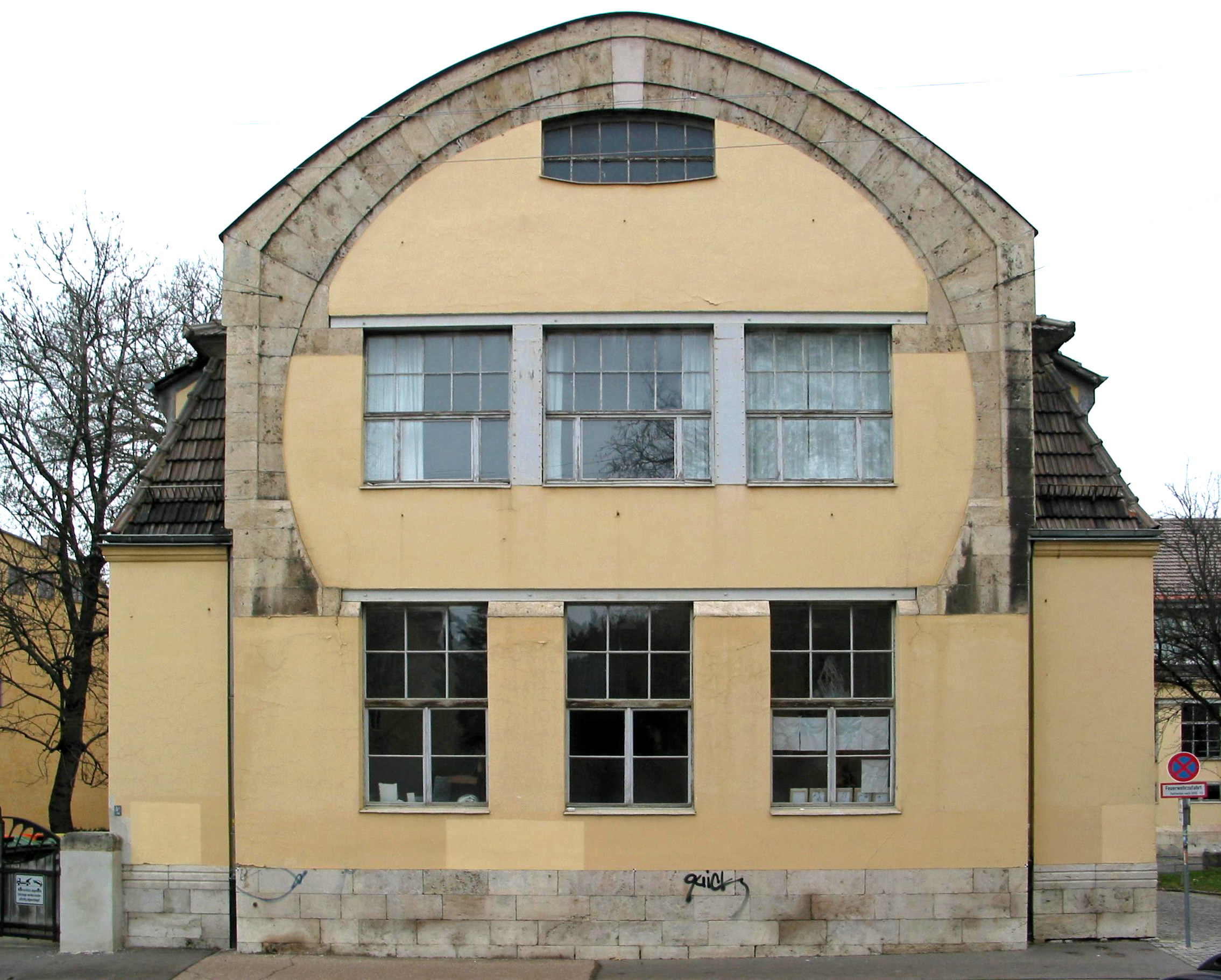
The "horseshoe" (south gable) of the School of Arts and Crafts, designed by Henry van de Velde and built in 1905–1906

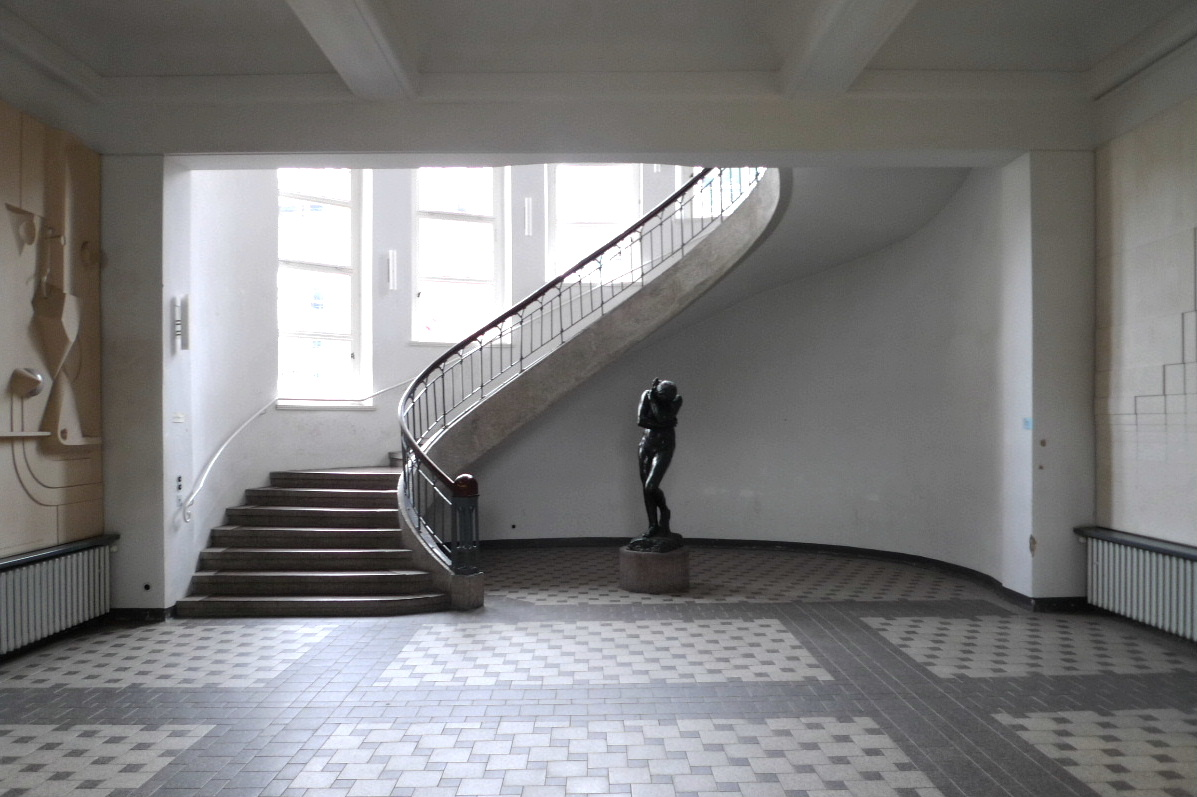
Foyer of the former Art School, today the main building of the Bauhaus-Universität Weimar, with an art nouveau free-winding staircase and Auguste Rodin's "Eva" at the center

The history of the Bauhaus-Universität Weimar goes back to 1860 when Grand Duke Carl Alexander (Saxe-Weimar-Eisenach) founded the Grand Ducal Saxon Art School. Although it became a public institution in 1902, its ties with the ducal house remained strong for years. Students were instructed in a variety of artistic subjects, including landscape, historical, portrait and animal painting, and sculpting. In 1905 the Art School merged with the Weimar Sculpture School, which, although integrated into the educational system in a "cooperative relationship between high and applied art", was independently managed. The school was raised to college status in 1910 and was renamed the Grand Ducal Saxon College of Fine Arts. The development of the Bauhaus-Universität Weimar was also strongly influenced by the Grand Ducal Saxon School of Arts and Crafts which trained artisans in the handicrafts between 1907 and 1915. Both schools issued certificates of participation and conferred diplomas.

The names of renowned artists, instructors and students can be found in the historical documents and records of both schools.

=== Directors of the Art School ===
- 1860 Stanislaus von Kalckreuth, painter
- 1876 Theodor Hagen, painter
- 1882 Albert Brendel, painter
- 1885 Emil von Schlitz, sculptor
- 1902 Hans Olde, painter
- 1910 Fritz Mackensen, painter
- 1916 Provisional administration
- 1919 Incorporation into the State Bauhaus

=== Directors of the Sculpture School ===
- 1905 Adolf Brütt, sculptor
- 1910 Gottlieb Elster, sculptor
- 1913 Richard Engelmann
- 1919 Incorporation into the State Bauhaus

=== Directors of the School of Arts and Crafts ===
- 1907–1915 Henry van de Velde, architect and designer
- Discussed successor candidate Walter Gropius

=== Staatliches Bauhaus ===
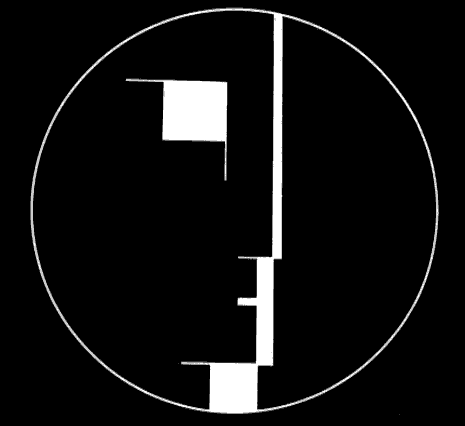
The Bauhaus signet

In 1919 Walter Gropius merged the College of Fine Arts and the School of Arts and Crafts into the Staatliches Bauhaus in Weimar. It was the making of a new type of art school, a pioneer of modernity, the legacy of which continues to influence the Bauhaus-University Weimar today. In 1923 Gropius summarized his vision with the radical formula "Art and Technology – A New Unity." His "concept of collaboration with the industry" was strongly opposed, not least of all because he was "determined from the very start to beat down any resistance toward this new kind of architecturally related art."

The increasing equalization of professors and workshop instructors and unbridgeable differences made it impossible "for art to develop freely, without purpose and with no connection to architecture at the Bauhaus." As a result, the State College of Fine Arts was founded in 1921, an institution at which academically traditional masters could work and teach, such as Richard Engelmann, Max Thedy, Walther Klemm, Alexander Olbricht and Hugo Gugg (Hedwig Holtz-Sommer's instructor). The Bauhaus only remained in Weimar until spring 1925 when it was forced to relocate to Dessau for political reasons. There the Bauhaus began a new, important chapter as a college of art and design.

UNESCO designated the joint World Heritage Site titled the Bauhaus and its Sites in Weimar, Dessau and Bernau in December 1996. The Bauhaus sites in Weimar that are part of the World Heritage Site are the main building (formerly the Grand Ducal Saxon School of Fine Art) and the Van de Velde building (formerly the Grand Ducal Saxon School of Arts and Crafts) on the Bauhaus University campus, and the Haus am Horn.

==== Director ====
- 1919–1925 Walter Gropius, architect

=== College of Trades and Architecture ===
The State College of Trades and Architecture, or College of Architecture for short, succeeded the Bauhaus in 1926, which, since the State School of Architecture had moved to Gotha, offered its own regular postgraduate courses in Architecture in the form both Van de Velde and Gropius had long envisioned. Although the College of Architecture continued to adhere to the idea of the Bauhaus, it offered a much more practical orientation. This corresponded to the "concept of a construction-based, productive working community," which represented one of the founding principles of this successor institution. The experimental and innovative focus of the Bauhaus fell somewhat to the wayside. In 1929 there were 88 students enrolled at the College of Architecture. After completing their education, graduates received a diploma in the Construction department and the title "Journeyman" or "Master" in their area of handicraft.

Paul Schultze-Naumburg rejected all phenomena of industrial, urban society. He strived to establish a new architectural style that exuded "Gemütlichkeit", or coziness. In his opinion, it was necessary to preserve the German styles typical of the region, so that people could find identification and orientation in times of rapid social and cultural upheaval. Graduates of the Architecture course received the title "Diplom-Architekt" (certified architect), while artists received a simple certificate and craftspeople received the title "Journeyman" or "Master".

The well-known artists and instructors of this period include: Hermann Giesler, Hans Seytter (e.g., Stiftskirche, Stuttgart), Walther Klemm, Alexander Olbricht and Hugo Gugg.

==== Director ====
- 1930–1939 Paul Schultze-Naumburg, architect and art theorist

=== College of Architecture and Fine Arts ===
The institution officially attained college-level status in 1942. By this time, the School of Trades had been removed from the college, which now called itself the College of Architecture and Fine Arts. After World War II, the Soviet Military Administration of Thuringia oversaw the restructuring of the college to reflect antifascist-democratic principles. Under the aegis of the architect Hermann Henselmann, appointed director in 1946, the college focused its efforts to rebuild the country and pick up where the Bauhaus left off. Some even suggested changing the name of the college to "The Bauhaus – College of Architecture and Handicraft and Engineering Design."

==== Directors ====
- 1940 Provisional administrator Rudolf Rogler
- 1942 Gerhard Offenberg (1897–1987), architect (e.g., reconstruction planning in Nordhausen)
- 1946 Hermann Henselmann, architect
- 1950 Provisional administrator Friedrich August Finger (1885–1961), civil engineer and building materials engineer (e.g., construction supervisor of the Baghdad Railway)

=== College of Architecture and Civil Engineering ===
After the GDR was established and the East German university system was restructured, the college itself underwent major changes in 1951. The "Fine Arts" department, which had previously been chaired by the sculptor Siegfried Tschierschky, was dissolved. The new College of Architecture was placed under the control of the "Ministry of Reconstruction" with the objective to develop academic and research programs for a new technical college of civil engineering.

In 1954 the college received a rectorial constitution with two new faculties: "Civil Engineering" and "Building Materials Science and Technology". Otto Englberger, an architect, professor of "Residential and Community Building," and provisional director of the college since 1951, was appointed the first vice-chancellor of the new College of Architecture and Civil Engineering Weimar (HAB). In the following decades, the college became one of the leading academic institutions in the field of civil engineering, respected throughout East and West Germany alike.

Because the college was so integrated in the political system of the GDR, the direction of its instruction and research activities was largely dictated by the government for the purpose of carrying out the latest civil engineering tasks. The third higher education reform of 1968/69 modernized and reorganized the structure of the college based on business administration principles. The faculties were replaced by "sections", and the college was expanded to include the section of "Computer Technology and Data Processing." In 1976 research and reception of the Bauhaus was revived at the HAB Weimar. It represented the first step of an ongoing positive re-evaluation of the legacy of the college. Thanks to these research efforts, the college established relations with other institutions, including several in West Germany.

Ever since 1951, students in all disciplines were required by East German law to pass a basic study program in Marxist–Leninist philosophy. Later, academic staff, lecturers and professors were also required to complete training on a regular basis. The Institute for Marxism–Leninism, which offered these courses at the HAB, was closed in 1990.

The well-known artists and instructors of this period include: Walther Klemm and Anita Bach (born 1927, first female professor of architecture in the GDR).

==== Vice-chancellors ====
- 1954 Otto Englberger (1905–1977), architect (e.g., tenement buildings at Buchenwaldplatz Weimar and the Franzberg School in Sondershausen)
- 1957 Gustav Batereau (1908–1974), steel construction engineer and structural engineer (e.g., large coking plant in Lauchhammer)
- 1963 Horst Matzke, physicist and mathematician
- 1968 Armin Petzold, civil engineer
- 1970 Karl-Albert Fuchs, civil engineer (vice-president of the German Civil Engineering Academy in Berlin)
- 1983 Hans Glißmeyer (1936–2008), civil engineer
- 1989 Hans Ulrich Mönnig (born 1943), civil engineer
- 1992 Gerd Zimmermann (born 1946), architect and architectural theorist

=== Bauhaus-Universität Weimar ===
The political upheaval of 1989 initiated a radical process of restructuring at the college. The goal was to quickly adapt the college to the basic principles of freedom and democracy and integrate it into the international community of higher education institutions. Several changes were made to its overall structure; redundant departments were merged or dissolved. A new chapter began in 1993 with the establishment of the "Faculty of Art and Design" which reincorporated the artistic disciplines into the academic profile of the college. The establishment of the "Faculty of Media" in 1996 emphasized the college's dedication to progressive thinking. After changing its name to the "Bauhaus-Universität Weimar" in 1996, the university demonstrated its dedication to the spirit of the Bauhaus.

The well-known artists and instructors of this period include: Lucius Burckhardt, Werner Holzwarth and Wolfgang Ernst.

==== Former rectors ====
- 1996 Gerd Zimmermann
- 2001 Walter Bauer-Wabnegg (born 1954), theologian, linguist and literary scholar
- 2004 Gerd Zimmermann
- 2011 Karl Beucke (born 1951), civil engineer

==== Presidents ====
- 2017 Winfried Speitkamp (born 1958), historian
- 2022 Jutta Emes, Interim President (born 1969), economist
- 2023 Peter Benz (born 1971), architect

== Faculties ==
The university possesses a unique structure with four main faculties. It has fostered a diverse profile of instruction and research based on engineering and architectural disciplines. Today the university offers students a selection of approximately 40 degree programs. The term "Bauhaus" in its name stands for eagerness to experiment, openness, creativity, proximity to industrial practice and internationality.

=== Architecture and Urbanism ===
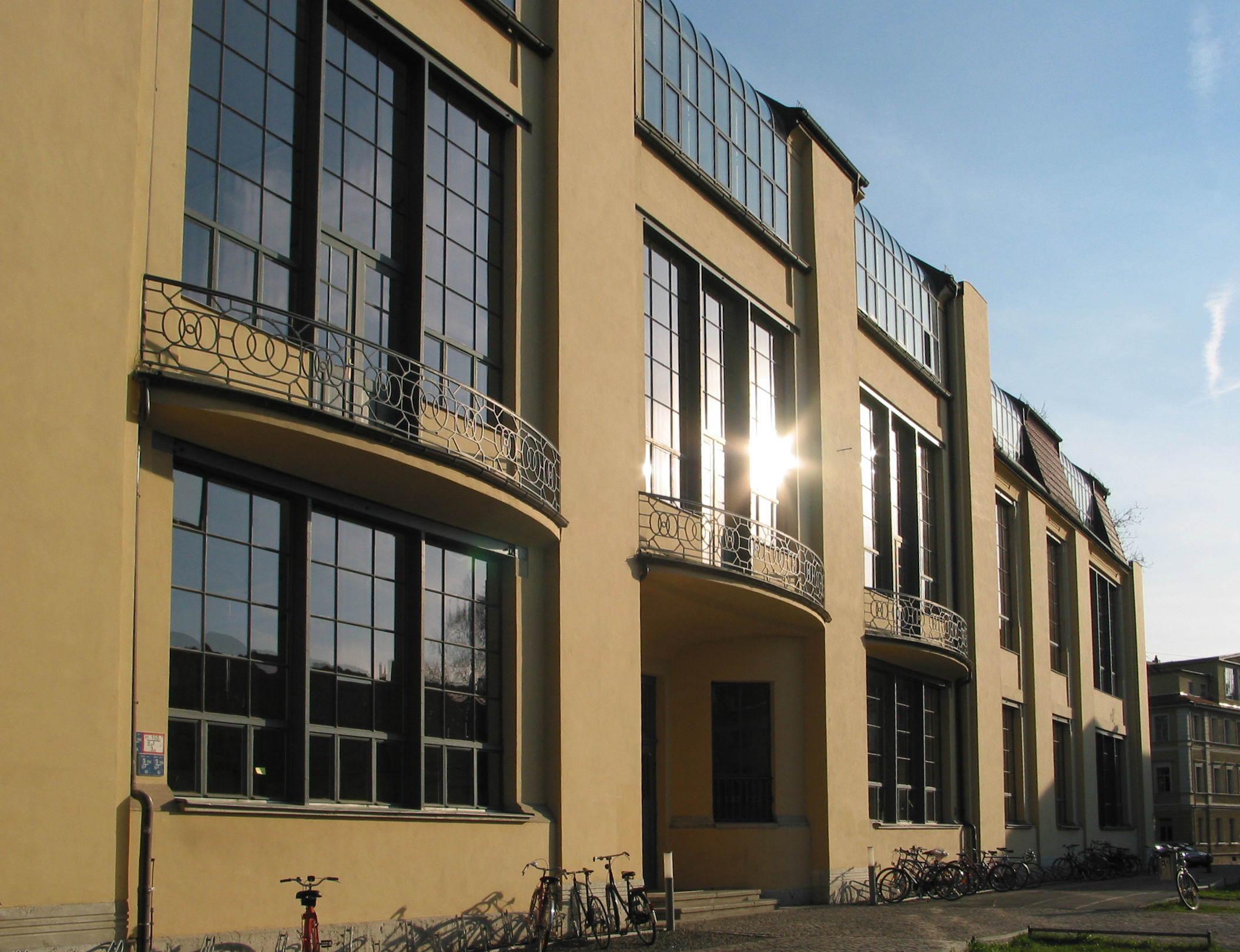
The Faculty of Architecture and Urbanism is situated in the main building of the Bauhaus-University Weimar, one of UNESCO's World Heritage Sites

The Faculty of Architecture and Urban Studies stands for university-based research and experimental teaching, which imparts interface competencies of artistic and scientific methods in design and planning. It currently has 80 partner universities and is considered one of the most influential architecture faculties in Germany.

Student enrolment at the Faculty of Architecture and Urbanism: 1,155 (winter semester 2021/22)

Degree programs:

- Architecture (bachelor's and master's)
- Urbanism (bachelor's and master's)
- Media Architecture (master's)
- Integrated Urban Development and Design (master's)
- European Urban Studies (master's)

Programs for young scientists:

- European Doctoral Program "Urban Hist | 20th Century European Urbanism
- DFG Research Training Group "Identity and Heritage
- Junior Research Group "Social Housing in Growing Metropolises

The Faculty of Architecture and Urban Studies has its headquarters in the main building, which was designed by Van de Velde and is a UNESCO World Heritage Site. Seminar and studio spaces for students of the faculty are located here.

Reflection on heritage shapes the teaching and research of the three institutes at the faculty – even beyond the 100th anniversary of the Bauhaus in 2019:

- Institute for European Urban Studies (IfEU)
- Bauhaus Institute for the History and Theory of Architecture and Planning
- bauhaus.institute for experimental architecture (bauhaus.ifex).

By researching space, city and architecture under changing social boundary conditions, the faculty contributes to the sustainable design of architecture, city and landscape. In exhibitions and symposia, it enters into an exchange with the public.

=== Civil Engineering ===
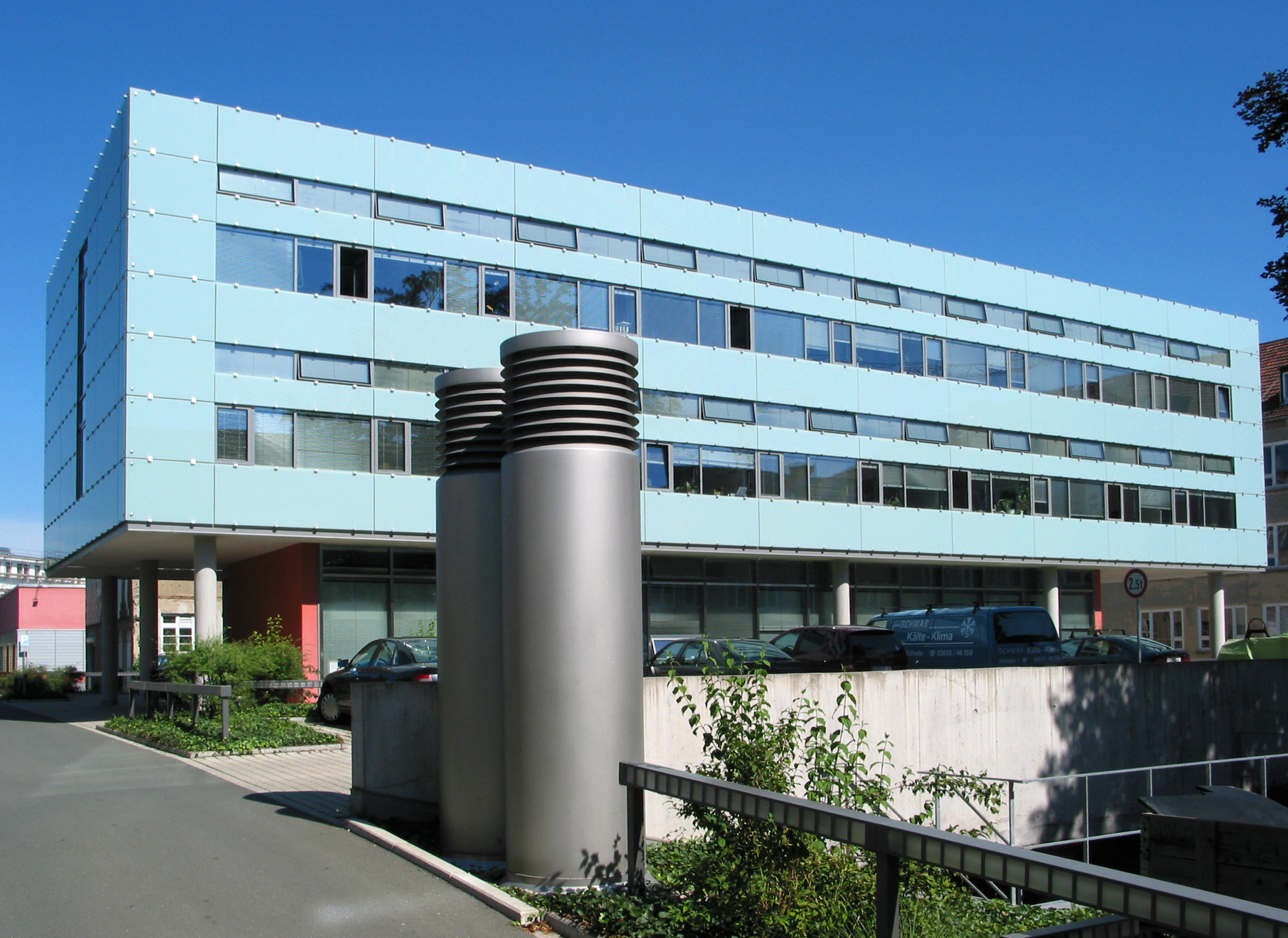
The Faculty of Civil Engineering, located on Coudraystraße

Founded in 1954, the Faculty of Civil Engineering today combines the disciplines of natural sciences and computer science, mechanics, construction, materials, environment and management under one roof. In addition to traditional and modern engineering methods, the faculty also draws from neighboring scientific fields such as law, economics and social sciences. This enables it to assume responsibility throughout the life cycle of the built environment and to participate in its further development.

In the area of research, the faculty focuses primarily on future-oriented new technologies such as BIM. The focus of teaching is on project studies. The research profile is largely determined by six institutes:

- Bauhaus Institute for Future-Oriented Infrastructure Systems (b.is).
- BuiltEnvironment-Management-Institute (B-M-I)
- F.A. Finger Institute for Building Materials Science (FIB)
- Institute for Building Informatics, Mathematics and Building Physics (IBMB)
- Institute for Structural Engineering (IKI)
- Institute for Structural Mechanics (ISM)

Student enrolment at the Faculty of Civil Engineering (incl. the Digital Engineering program): 998 (winter semester 2021/2022). Furthermore, 285 persons deepen their knowledge in offers of the central continuing education.

Degree programs:

- Civil Engineering (bachelor's and master's)
- Environmental Engineering (bachelor's and master's)
- Management [Construction Real Estate Infrastructure] (bachelor's and master's)
- Building Materials Engineering (master's)

International Degree Programs:

- Natural Hazards and Risks in Structural Engineering (master's)
- Digital Engineering (master's), together with the Faculty of Media

Part-time Master's programs:

- Building Physics and Energy Optimization of Buildings (master's)
- Water and Environment (master's)
- Methods and materials for user-oriented building renovation (master's)
- Project Management [Construction] (master's)
- Environmental Engineering (master's)

=== Art and Design ===
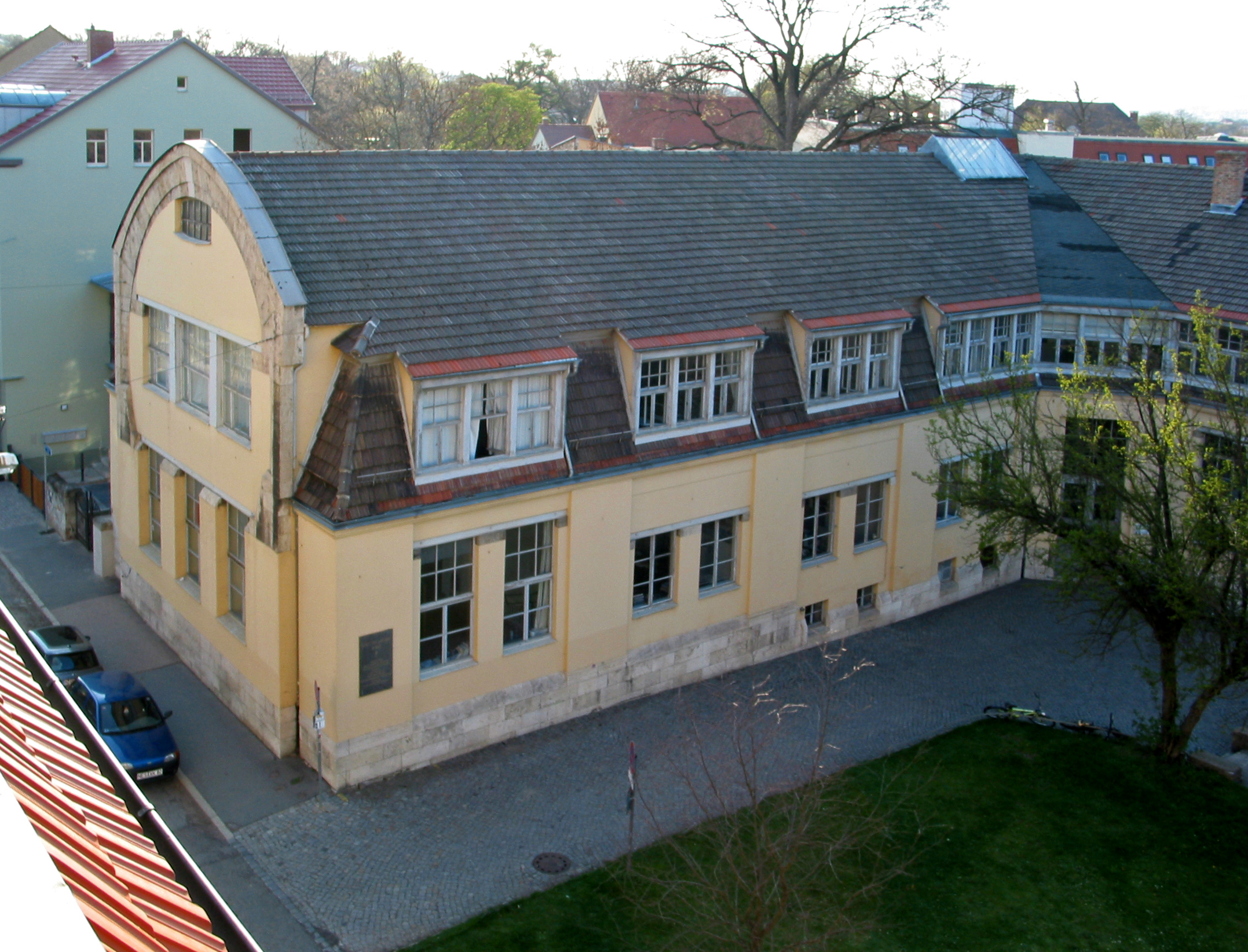
The Faculty of Art and Design in the Van de Velde Building

The Faculty of Art and Design was founded in 1993. It is the university training center for designers and artists in the Free State of Thuringia. With its teaching concept, the "Weimar Model", it places the project at the center of studies and thus differs from the classical art academies and studies in fixed class systems. The content of teaching and research at the faculty is the project and design of human living spaces. The focus is on the recognition and promotion of creative forces and the search for possibilities of their practical implementation.

Student enrolment at the Faculty of Art and Design: 955 (winter semester 2021/22)

Degree programs:

- Fine Art (Diplom)
- Media Art/Media Design (bachelor's and master's)
- Product Design (bachelor's and master's)
- Visual Communication (bachelor's and master's)
- Teacher training at secondary schools – double subject art education (1st state examination)
- Teacher training at secondary schools – second subject art education (1st state examination)

International Degree Programs:

- Public Art and New Artistic Strategies/Art in Public Spaces and New Artistic Strategies (master's)

PhD:

- Doctoral program in Art and Design / Fine Art / Media Art (Doctor of Philosophy / PhD / Dr. phil.)

The Faculty of Art and Design has been using the studios and classrooms in the former School of Arts and Crafts (Van de Velde Building) since 1996. Following a renovation phase lasting two years, the Faculty of Art and Design returned to the Van de Velde Building in April 2010. In November 2013, the faculty celebrated its 20th anniversary with the festival week. For 23 years Jay Rutherford, a Canadian graphic designer, was the professor of Visual Communications.

=== Media ===
The Faculty of Media is the youngest of the four faculties at Bauhaus-Universität Weimar and is dedicated to researching media challenges of the digital present and future as well as the innovative shaping of media development. In teaching as well as in research, the faculty places humanities-literary culture with scientific-technical culture in a constructive, creative and critical dialogue. It promotes professional and human exchange across the disciplinary boundaries of technology, science and art. Research, research-oriented, project-based teaching and interdisciplinary cooperation characterize the faculty's self-image. It is significantly involved in the two university-wide research focuses Digital Engineering and Cultural Studies Media Research.

The Faculty of Media comprises three departments: Media Studies, Media Informatics and Media Management. The study program has a strong international orientation. Several degree programs are offered in English. In addition, the faculty has a German-French study program. Graduates are employed in the cultural and educational sectors, in IT, in media companies and in science and research.

Student enrolment at the Faculty of Media (incl. the Digital Engineering program): 758 (winter semester 2021/2022)

Degree programs:

Department of Media Informatics:

- Computer Science (bachelor's), with majors in Media Informatics or Security and Data Science

International Degree Programs:

- Computer Science for Digital Media (master's)
- Human-Computer Interaction (master's)
- Digital Engineering (Master of Science), together with the Faculty of Civil Engineering

Department of Media Studies:

- Media Culture (bachelor's)
- Media Studies (master's)

Department of Media Management:

- Media Management (master's)

Study Programs:

- Film Cultures – Extended Cinema (master's)

International Degree Programs:

- European Media Culture (with Université Lyon Lumière 2: Bachelor of Arts, Licence en Information-Communication)

== University library ==
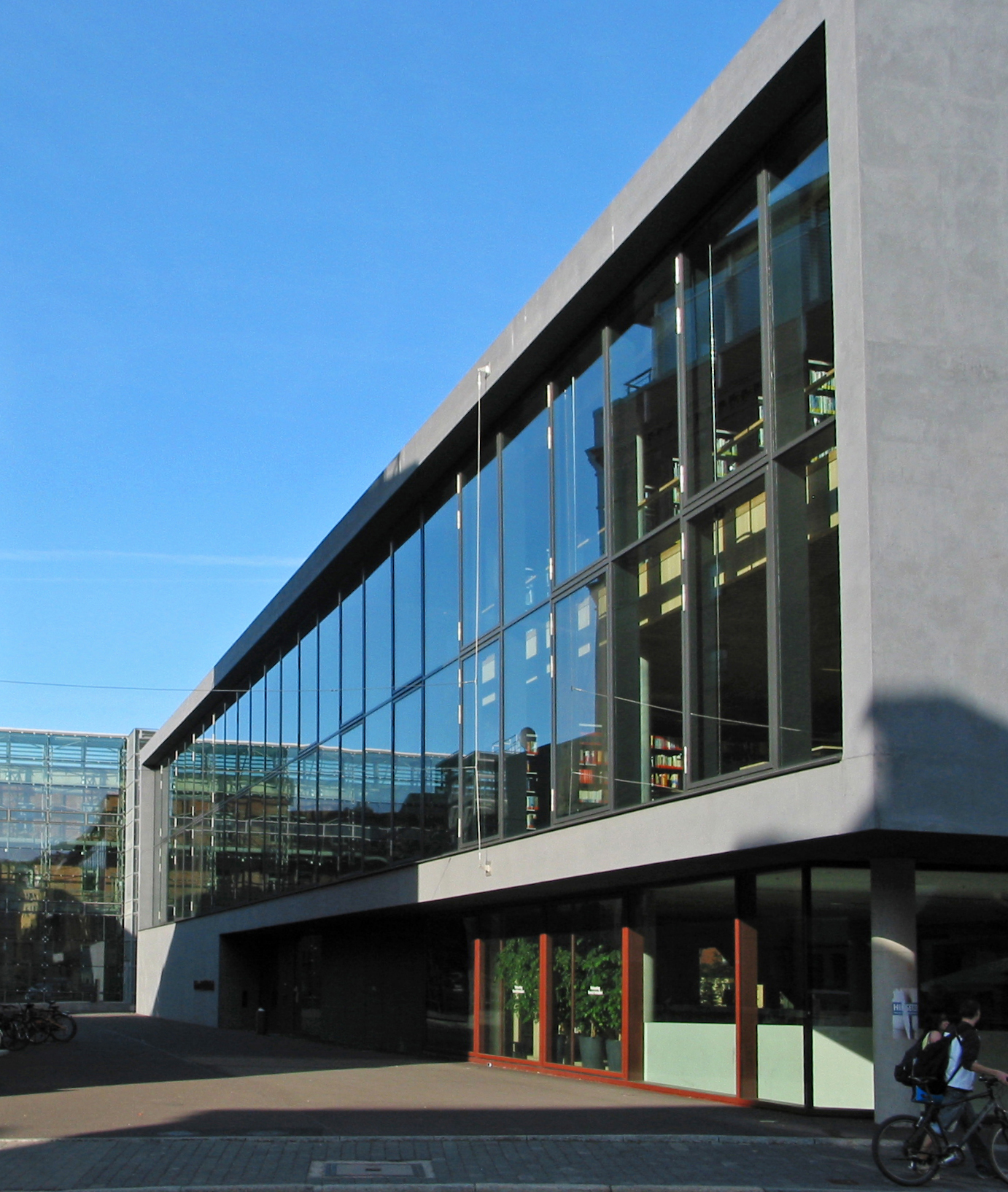
The new university library with an integrated lecture hall

Following German reunification, a vacated industrial facility in the vicinity of the historic center of Weimar near the Frauenplan and Goethe's house was chosen as the site of a new library and lecture hall for the Bauhaus-Universität Weimar.

Following an urban planning competition in 1991, the architects' office meck architekten (Munich) were commissioned to design the building. After a four-year construction phase costing 12 million euros, the new university library and an integrated main auditorium were officially opened in 2005, and in 2006, the building was awarded the Thuringian State Prize for Architecture and Urban Planning.

== Notable alumni ==
- Bruno Flierl, architect and city planner (1927–2023)
- Heike Hanada (born 1964), architect
- Günther Krause (born 1953), engineer, academic and politician
- Max Liebermann (1847–1935), painter
- Farkas Molnár (1897–1945) Hungarian architect, painter, essayist, and graphic artist
- Karl Lorenz Rettich (1841–1904), painter
- Friedrich Wachenhusen (1859–1925), painter
