= Farajollah Mizani =

Iranian writer and translator

- Born: 1925; Tabriz, Iran
- Died: 1988 (aged 62–63); Iran
- Cause of death: Execution
- Education: University of Tehran
- Occupation: Engineer
- Political party: Tudeh Party

Farajollah Mizani (Persian: فرج‌الله میزانی), also known by the pen name Javanshir (Persian: جوانشیر, lit. 'young lion'), was an Iranian communist and a senior member of the Leninist Tudeh Party.

== Early life and education ==
Mizani was born in 1925 in Tabriz. He studied engineering at University of Tehran. Years later he was graduated with a PhD in Persian literature from a Soviet university.

== Career ==
Mizani joined Tudeh Party in 1945, while he was a university student. In 1957, he fled to the Soviet Union and was exiled until 1979. While there, for some time he headed the party's clandestine radio named Peyk-e-Iran and studied at university. After Iranian Revolution, he returned to Iran and was a member of the party's central committee. In 1983, he was arrested by the Islamic Republic government and put on trial. He was among those who were killed during 1988 executions of Iranian political prisoners.

Party political offices
Preceded by Noureddin Kianouri	Second Secretary of the Tudeh Party of Iran; 1979–1984	Succeeded by Hamid Safari
Preceded by Amanollah Qoreishi	Secretary-in-Charge of Tehran Provincial Committee of Tudeh Party; 1953–1957	Vacant Title next held by Abbas Hajari
