= Ali Sadeghe =

Iranian architect

Ali Sadeghe was an Iranian architect, and one of the founders in 1945 of the influential Association of Iranian Architects.
