= Abbas Hajari =

Iranian communist and military officer

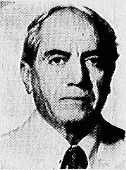
- Hajari in 1979
- Born: Abbas Hajari-Bajestani; 21 September 1922; Mashhad, Iran
- Died: 1988 (aged 65–66)
- Political party: Tudeh Party

Details
- Date apprehended: 1954–1978; 1983–1988
- Military career
- Education: Officers' School
- Branch: Imperial Iranian Army

Abbas Hajari (Persian: عباس حجری) was an Iranian communist and military officer.

He was member of the Tudeh Military Network that was uncovered in 1954, as a result he spent 25 years in prison until 1978. After the Iranian Revolution, he ran for an Assembly of Experts for Constitution seat from Tehran constituency. He was Secretariat-in-charge of Tehran provincial committee.

In 1983, he was arrested by the Islamic Republic government and was put on trial. Reynaldo Galindo Pohl, United Nations Special Rapporteur on Human Rights in Iran, cites his name among the victims of 1988 executions of Iranian political prisoners.

Party political offices
Vacant Title last held by Farajollah Mizani	Secretary-in-Charge of Tehran Provincial Committee of Tudeh Party; 1979–1983	Succeeded by Rahman Hatefi
