= Democratic Organization of Iranian Women =

Organization of Iranian Women
- Founded: 18 February 1943; 83 years ago
- Newspaper: Bidari-e Ma
- Ideology: Marxist feminism
- National affiliation: Tudeh Party of Iran
- International affiliation: Women's International Democratic Federation
- Slogan: Persian: ما هم در این خانه حقی داریم "We, too, have rights in this house"

Website
- tdzi.org

The Democratic Organization of Iranian Women (DAW; Persian: تشکیلات دموکراتیک زنان ایران) is the women's wing of the Tudeh Party of Iran.

Led by Maryam Firouz, it was founded in 1943 as the 'Organization of Iranian Women' (OIW) (Persian: تشکیلات زنان ایران, romanized: Tashkilat-i Zanan-i Iran) and joined Women's International Democratic Federation in 1947.

The organization "demanded radical transformations in the laws governing the rights of women in the family and at the workplace", according to Hammed Shahidian.

It supported reform of women's rights, operated day care, women's professional courses and published women's magazines, and was one of the first Iranian women's organizations to campaign in favor of women's suffrage alongside the Womens party of Iran. The Democratic Society of Women managed to have a suggestion of women's suffrage put before the Majilis in 1944, but it was defeated by the religious conservatives.

They published a monthly magazine named Bidari-e Ma (lit. 'Our Awakening'), edited by Zahra Eskandari-Bayat.

OIW was banned in 1949, along with Tudeh itself and other affiliates, but the party managed to revive it in 1951 with another name: 'Democratic Organization of Iranian Women'.
