= Keyghobad Zafar =

Iranian architect

Keyghobad Zafar was an Iranian architect, and one of the founders in 1945 of the influential Association of Iranian Architects.
