= Farkas Molnár =

Hungarian architect, designer, painter (1897–1945)

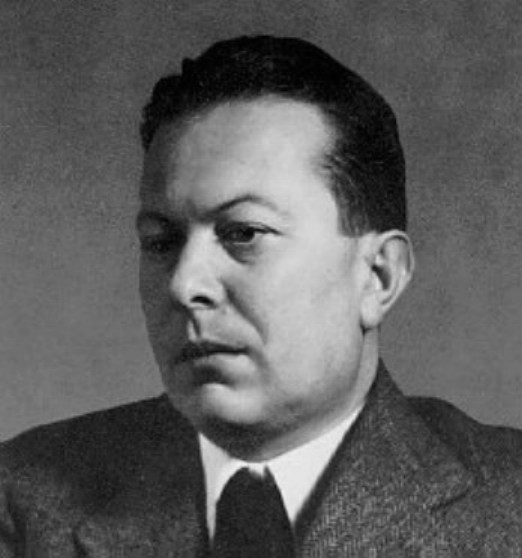
- Born: Farkas Ferenc Molnár; 21 June 1897; Pécs, Hungary
- Died: 11 January 1945 (aged 47); Budapest, Hungary
- Other names: Wolfgang Molnár, Farkas Molnar
- Occupations: Architect, painter, essayist, graphic artist
- Movement: Bauhaus
- Spouse: Herrfurt Hedvig (1906–1993)

Farkas "Wolfgang" Ferenc Molnár (1897–1945) was a Hungarian architect, painter, essayist, and graphic artist. He is associated with the first generation of Bauhaus movement, and was active in Budapest.

== Biography ==
Farkas Molnár was born in 1897 in Pécs, southwestern Hungary. He attended Hungarian University of Fine Arts from 1915 to 1917; followed by study at the Budapest University of Technology and Economics in 1917 before he was expelled for his leftist views.

In 1921, he became a member of Bauhaus University, Weimar and studied under Johannes Itten, and later Walter Gropius. In 1923, he organized the first exhibition of the Bauhaus, at which time he exhibited a plan for a house known as German: Der rote Wiirfel, lit. 'Red Cube House'. In 1924, he studied under Georg Muche and Marcel Breuer; and worked on designing the exterior and interior of terraced houses.

He moved back to Hungry in 1925, where he graduated from Budapest University of Technology and Economics, studied under Dezső Hültl and Iván Kotsis. He participated in the KUT exhibitions with his paintings and designs, as well as was a founding member of the Hungarian Workshop Association, and took part in the Bauhaus tradition of the Green Donkey Theater's stage workshop. Molnár designed the "U-Theatre", a motorized stage that could glide horizontally.

In 1929, Gropius invited him to the CIAM Congress (Congres Internationaux d'Architecture Moderne) in Frankfurt. After his return, together with Marcello Breuer and József Fischer, he founded the CIAM branch in Hungary.

His work is part of museum collections including Museum of Modern Art (MoMA), and Stedelijk Museum Amsterdam.

== Publications ==
- Schlemmer, Oskar; Moholy-Nagy, Laszlo; Molnar, Farkas (1925). Die Bühne im Bauhaus [The Theater of the Bauhaus]. Langen, München: Bauhausbücher. ISBN 978-3786114598.
- Schlemmer, Oskar; Moholy-Nagy, László; Molnár, Farkas; Gropius, Walter (1978). A Bauhaus Színháza. Budapest: Corvina. ISBN 9789631302493.
