= Bruno Flierl =

German architect and journalist (1927–2023)

- Born: 2 February 1927; Bunzlau, Lower Silesia, Prussia, German Reich
- Died: 17 July 2023 (aged 96); Berlin, Germany
- Education: Berlin University of the Arts; Deutsche Bauakademie
- Occupation: Architect
- Children: Thomas

Bruno Flierl (German pronunciation: [ˈbʁuːno ˈfliːɐ̯l]; 2 February 1927 – 17 July 2023) was a German architect, architecture critic, and writer. His work focused on architecture, urban development, and city planning of East Germany. He assisted in the design of the Pariser Platz and argued for the preservation of the Palace of the Republic in the debate over the restoration of the Berlin Palace.

== Early life ==
Flierl was born in Bunzlau, Province of Lower Silesia, in present-day Poland, on 2 February 1927. He fought in World War II and was in French war captivity until 1947. In 1948, he began studying architecture at the Berlin University of the Arts. A dedicated communist, he took up residence in East Germany in 1952. From 1952 to 1961, he was a research fellow at the Deutsche Bauakademie. During this time, he worked with architects including Hans Schmidt. In 1953, he graduated from the Bauhaus University, Weimar.

== Career ==
Flierl started his career as an architectural theorist and a university lecturer. His work at the Weimar School of Architecture, along with researchers including Karl-Heinz Heuter, contributed to the rediscovery of Bauhaus for socialism in the 1960s. During the period between 1962 and 1964, he was editor-in-chief of the magazine Deutsche Architektur. Because the magazine also published articles critical of city planning in East Germany, Flierl came into conflict with the Socialist Unity Party of Germany (SED), and was forced to leave. In 1982, the SED declared him an "enemy of the state". He was a critic of schematic prefabricated construction, and was known to have advocated for modern architecture while calling out the ecological, social, and cultural context of architecture.

Flierl gained a doctorate at the Bauakademie der DDR in 1972, and headed the Institute for Theory of Architecture and Urban Planning at the Bauakademie until 1979 and also headed the "Architecture and Fine Arts" working group at the Association of German Architects between 1975 and 1982. He taught at Humboldt University of Berlin beginning in 1980. After 1989, Flierl served in multiple urban planning committees focused on the German reunification efforts.

Flierl's work focused on studying the interplay between architecture and society. Some of his focus areas included urban highrises and the development of the Berlin city centre. Though he was an advocate of skyscrapers as a part of urban design, he argued for moderation of skyscrapers in Berlin.

Flierl assisted in the design of the Pariser Platz, a square at the city centre of Berlin, and argued for the preservation of the Palace of the Republic in the debate over the restoration of the Berlin Palace.

== Personal life ==
Flierl was married, with his wife dying while giving birth to their son in 1957. His son Thomas Flierl is an architectural historian and politician who served as counsellor for construction for the PDS in Berlin-Mitte in the 1990s, and as Berlin's senator for science and culture between 2002 and 2006. From 1995 to 1998 and again from 2006 to 2011 Thomas served as a member of the Abgeordnetenhaus of Berlin, first for the PDS and later for The Left.

Flierl died on 17 July 2023, at age 96, in a Berlin retirement home.
