= Vartan Hovanessian =

Iranian American architect

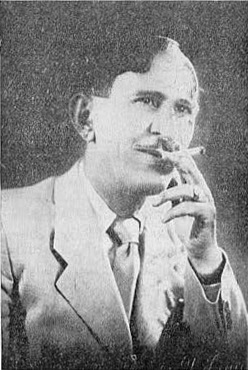
Vartan Hovanesian

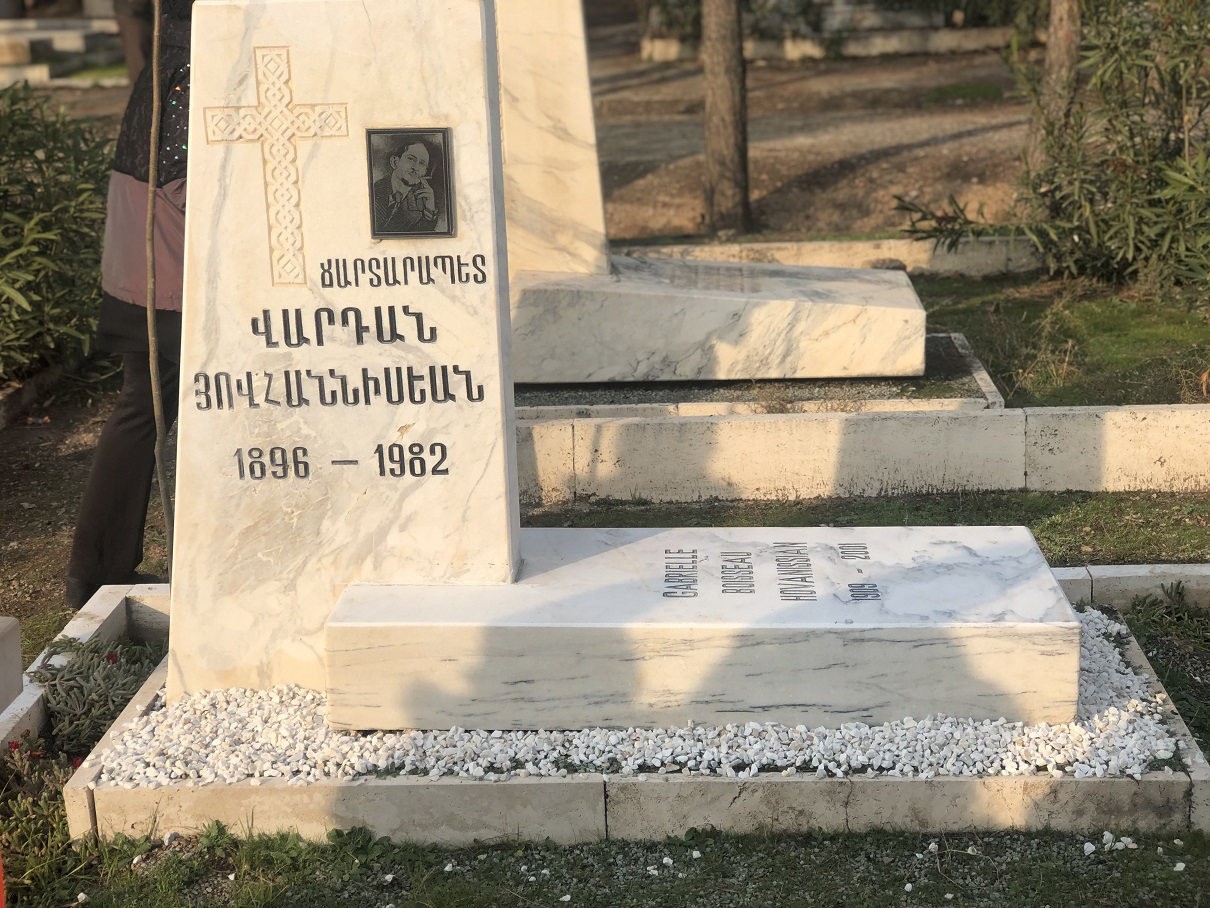
Vartan Hovanessian gravestone at Burastan cemetery in Tehran

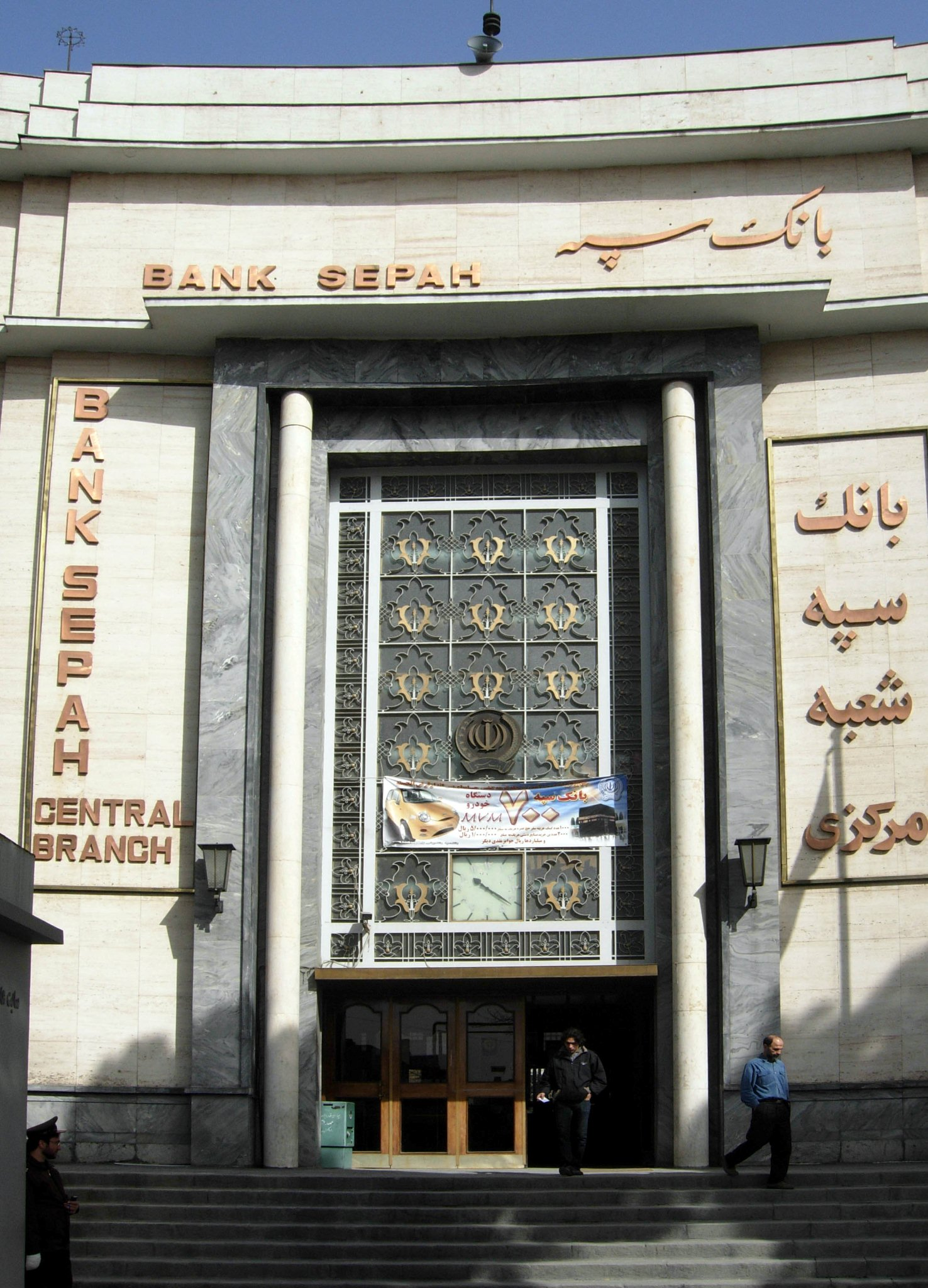
Bank Sepah

Vartan Hovanessian (Armenian: Վարդան Յովհանիսեան; Persian: 1986,وارطان هوانسیان in Tabriz – 1982 in Tehran) was an Iranian Armenian architect and leading figure in architectural practice and philosophy.

He was born in Tabriz. After high school graduation, he developed an interest in design and worked as a carpet designer in a German-owned carpet-weaving workshop in Tabriz before moving to Tehran, where he began a career of teaching. By the end of World War One, he took a trip to Paris to study painting in a school for fine arts, but shifted, after a while, to architecture. He studied architecture in École Spéciale d'Architecture of Paris. Holding a degree in architecture, he returned home after 17 years and worked notably in the fields of civil engineering and building architecture. He always preferred the title, "Architect Vartan". He, Aka Architect Vartan, stood out as a prolific and well-known designer of his time and made prominent constructions like "Ferdowsi Hotel", "Central Building of Sepah Bank", and "Sa'ad Abad Royal Palace". His architectural triumph included the construction of several movie halls including the "Metropol" and "Diana" movie-theaters. He died in 1982.

== Projects ==
Some his notable projects are:

- Metropol movie-theaters
- Diana movie-theaters
- Ferdowsi Hotel
- Darband Hotel
- Guest House of Tehran Railroad
- Central Building of Sepah Bank and its Isfahan Branch
- Shahreza Apartments
- Sa'ad Abad Royal Palace
- Jeep Building
- Girls’ Vocational School of Tehran

== Publications ==
His name frequently appeared on different magazines, including "The Architect" which had been published in Iran. Later, he founded the magazine, “The New Architecture” in Tehran.
